= USB Flash Drive Alliance =

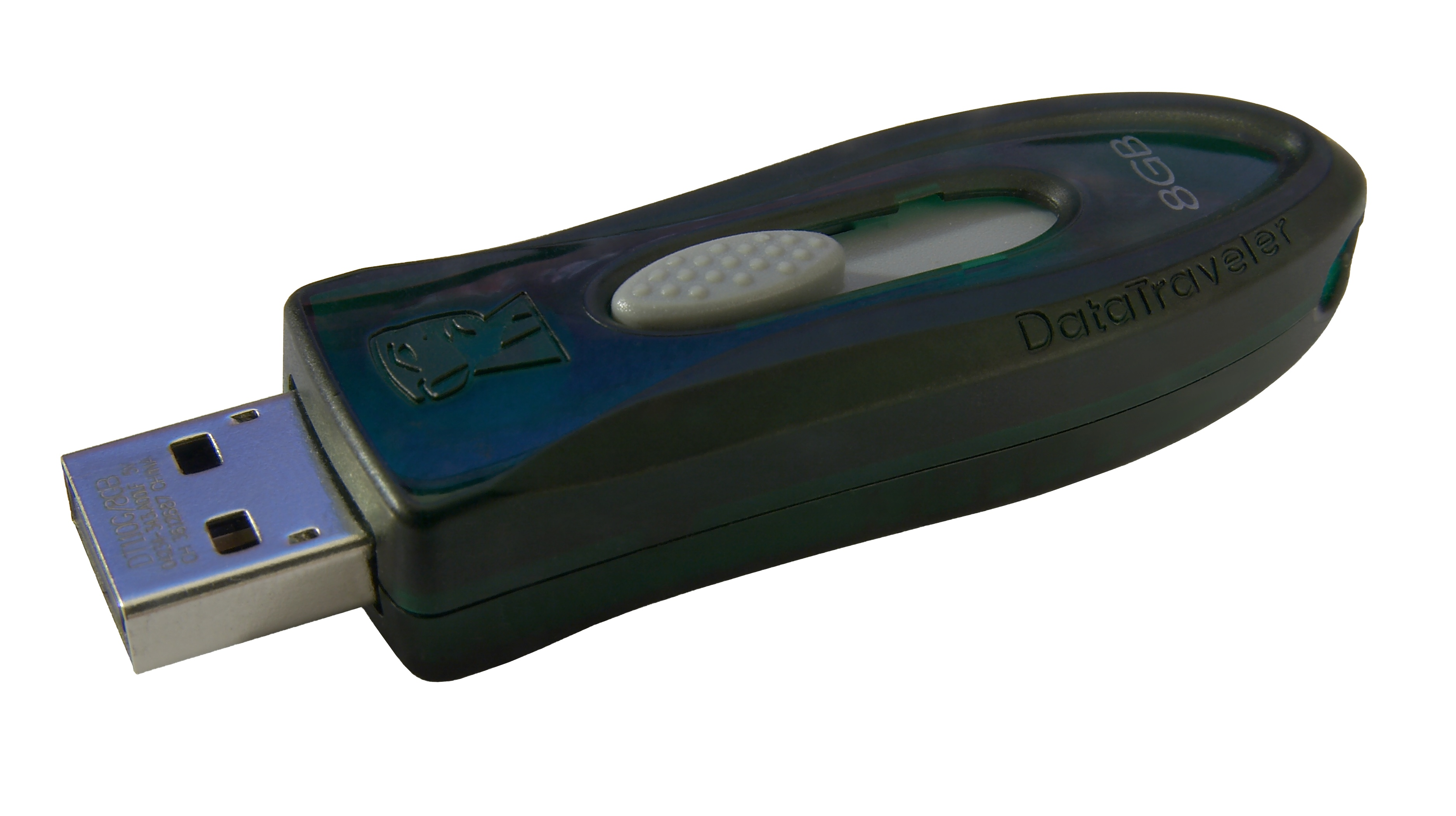
A Kingston USB flash drive.

The USB Flash Drive Alliance, founded in December 2003 by Samsung, Lexar Media, Kingston Technology and others, is a group of companies promoting the use of USB flash drives (also called "keydrives" and a variety of other names).

In 2003, according to the alliance, 50 million USB flash drives were sold in the US alone.

== Alliance members ==
- Buffalo Technology
- Corsair Gaming
- Crucial Technology
- Infineon Technologies
- Kingston Technology
- Lexar Media
- Microsoft
- Phison
- PNY Technologies
- Samsung
- SimpleTech

== See also ==
- USB
- USB flash drive
- U3 USB "smart" drives
