= GNM =

- Games 'n' Music
- Gaussian network model
- Gerakan Nelajan Marhaenis
- Germanisches Nationalmuseum
- German New Medicine (Germanische Neue Medizin) a pseudo scientific, anthroposophy based medical sham
- Global News Morning, A Canadian television news programme.
- GNM (API)
- Greenland National Museum
