= Games 'n' Music =

Nintendo DS homebrew device

Datel Games 'n' Music, otherwise known as Games 'n' Music or GnM was a mass market Nintendo DS homebrew device sold by Datel at an MSRP of $40. It inserts into the DS card slot and loads games from a MicroSD card. Unlike most flash cartridges (Flashcarts), Games 'n' Music does not officially support playing backup copies of DS game cards in order to showcase a product that is supportive of Nintendo as these backup copies are a major source of dispute within the Nintendo company. It was one of the few flash cartridges available in major American retail stores.

Games 'n' Music allows the user to play Movies, Music, and Homebrew applications on the Nintendo DS. It was criticized for its low compatibility with homebrew applications. However, with developments such as DLDI, an interface allowing homebrew applications to more easily access files on DS flashcarts, this become a non-issue.

The official product description states that the maximum supported MicroSD card size is 2 GB. Cards that are compatible include those made by Sandisk, Lexar, Kingston and PNY.
