= Henn Tan =

Henn Tan, is the Chairman, Chief Executive Officer, and Executive Director of Trek 2000 International, the company that invented the ThumbDrive, the first USB flash drive. This invention revolutionised the portable media storage industry and led to the phase out the floppy disk. Tan is a holder and inventor of numerous patents worldwide. He has also served as a board director at Ren Ci Hospital Limited since November 2010.

== Early life ==
Tan, the third son in a family of six boys, was born in a kampung in Geylang Lorong 17, Singapore to a pest-control worker father and housewife mother. Tan's family was poor and his parents spent most of their time earning a living. Tan went on to study at the Aljunied Technical High School, the first person in his family to enter secondary school. However, he came under the influence of bad company, and began skipping school. He completed his "O" Levels, but his life only began to take a turn when he entered the National Service, where he straightened out his life.

== Career ==
After completing his National Service, Tan joined a German multinational firm as a machinist. Tan then joined Sanshin Electronics, an agent for NEC Semiconductors, as a marketing executive from 1980 to 1983. He later joined Shin-Nichi, a member of the SANYO group of companies, in 1984. In Shin-Nichi, Tan worked his way up to become the director of operations where he oversaw the company's operations in Southeast Asia. In 1995, Tan resigned from the company.

== Trek 2000 ==
In 1995, Tan bought over Trek, a small family-owned electronic parts trading business in Geylang, for S$1 million. He restructured the company and changed its business focus to providing technology-driven engineering solutions to businesses. In 1998, the company was appointed the design house for Toshiba.

With his engineers, Tan began to explore ways to create a data storage device that utilises the USB interface. Their solution was the ThumbDrive, a plug-and-play memory drive that required no cable or adapters, and that could store more data than a floppy disk. In 2000, Tan presented the ThumbDrive at the CeBIT international technology fair in Germany. In the same year, Tan took his company public on the Singapore Exchange, hence the name Trek 2000. As of December 2011, the company’s annual revenue amounted to US $86.1million.

Tan quit his chairman position after the Singapore Exchange in 2018 objected to him continuing as the CEO, but he remained as chairman emeritus until 2020. Presently, his son Wayne is deputy chairman of Trek.

== Violations of Securities and Futures Act ==
In 2019, Tan was charged with 3 others over cheating and falsification of accounts. A year later, Tan was fined S$80,000 by Singapore police’s Commercial Affairs Department (CAD) for failing to disclose S$14m in company transactions. On 15 August 2022, Tan pleaded guilty to five charges of engaging in conspiracies to falsify accounts, forge documents to cover his tracks and cheat external auditors. He pleaded guilty to falsifying accounts and was sentenced to jail for 1 year 4 months in October 2022.

Tan had from as far back as between 2006 and 2011 conspired with then chief financial officer Gurcharan Singh to make false entries in Trek 2000's financial statements pertaining to some licensing income. Tan and his co-accused's crimes began to unravel when Trek 2000's auditors Ernst & Young (EY) discovered that Tan and his co-accused had cooked the books for financial year 2015. Tan then realised that the company's performance for financial year 2015 would be dismal and conspired with a few senior officers to inflate revenue and pre-tax operating profit by plucking a US$3.2 million sale from thin air - accompanied with false supporting documents. When confronted about the transaction, Tan and his co-accused tried to deceive EY that the sale was genuine and the financial statements had been drawn up properly. EY did not believe Tan and conducted further audit procedures, including forensic imaging of the laptops and computers of Singh, then president of regional sales Foo Kok Wah and former executive director Poo Teng Pin. This uncovered other fictitious deals in 2013, and EY reported the matter to the Accounting and Corporate Regulatory Authority, stating that it believed Trek 2000's management had made false and misleading statements regarding the US$3.2 million sale. EY later issued a disclaimer of opinion for Trek 2000's financial statements for financial year 2015.

== Awards and recognition ==
- Ernst & Young Emerging Entrepreneur of the Year 2002
- The INVENT Singapore Award 2008
- Special Achievement Award of the Year 2010, Asia pacific Entrepreneurship
- Engineering Leadership Award, Institute of Electrical and Electronics Engineer Inc (IEEE), 2011
- Rotary ASME Entrepreneur of the Year for Innovation, 2011
