= Netac Technology =

Chinese flash storage company

- Type: Public
- Industry: Consumer electronics
- Founded: April 29, 1999; 27 years ago
- Headquarters: Shenzhen, China
- Key people: Guoshun Deng, co-founder
- Products: SSDs, Memory Modules, USB flash drives, memory cards, External SSD and Hard Drive, and storage peripherals.
- Website: www.netac.com

Netac Technology Co., Ltd. (SZSE: 300042) is a Chinese data storage company headquartered in Shenzhen. The company claims to be the world's first inventor of the USB flash drive, although that claim is disputed by IBM and other manufacturers.

== History ==
Founded on 29 April 1999 by Guoshun "Frank" Deng and Cheng Xiaohua, the two worked for a year developing their first product, an eight megabyte flash memory drive that Deng christened the U disk.

== Products ==
As of 2021, Netac's product line mainly consists of solid-state drive, memory module, SD cards, USB flash drives, external hard disk drives, and peripherals.

=== Flash drive ===
On July 24, 2002, Netac was granted its first patent, for an electronic flash memory external storage method and device. At least 14 companies have since requested invalidation of this patent, as "[the patented device] has been anticipated by the combination of two references, i.e. USB System Architecture and the Handbook of Flash Memory Technology published in 1997 and such combination is obvious to those skilled in the art."

Although the company claims to have invented the first USB flash drive in 1999 and submitted a Chinese patent application for the device the same year, the patent was granted and the product launched only in 2002. IBM had released an eight megabyte USB flash drive in late 2000, which preceded Netac's offering to market by more than a year and a half.

== Patents ==
Unlike many other Chinese OEMs, Netac holds a number of patents. By 2009, Netac had filed for over 300 patents in the US, South Korea, Singapore, and the People's Republic of China. Over 200 of those patent applications had been filed by 2005.

Patents held by Netac include:

- Chinese Patent No. ZL99117225.6 for an electronic flash memory external storage method and device.
- Expired US Patent No. 6,829,672, for an electronic flash memory external storage method and device.
- Chinese Patent No. ZL02114797.3 for a USB Wireless Modem
- South Korean Patent No. 583626, for a multifunction semiconductor storage device and method for booting-up computer host
- Singaporean Patent No. SG119038, for an automatically executing method using semiconductor storage devices

== Lawsuits ==
Companies Netac has sued include US-based PNY Technologies, Beijing's Lenovo and Huaqi Information Digital Technology Co Ltd, Shenzhen's Fuguanghui and Xingzhidao, Japan-based Sony, and Taiwan's Acer and Tai Guen Enterprise Co.

Its 2006 lawsuit against PNY Technologies was the first time a Chinese company filed patent infringement charges overseas.

== Shenzhen Coocaa Network Technology Co Ltd ==
A joint venture with Skyworth, Shenzhen Coocaa Network Technology Co Ltd provides free high-definition movie and video download services. Netac has developed USB flash drives that, in conjunction with USB port equipped Skyworth televisions, allow video to be played from the drive.

== Production bases ==
Netac office building is located in Nanshan high-tech district which is the technology center of Shenzhen.
