= San disk =

SAN Disk may refer to:

- Storage Area Network computer storage devices (SAN disks)
- SanDisk Corporation (formerly known as SunDisk)
