= Attaché (disambiguation) =

An attaché is a person who is assigned ("attached") to the administrative staff of a superior, or to another service or agency.

Attaché may also refer to:

- A flash drive made by PNY Technologies
- A type of briefcase
- A wrestler in the Gorgeous Ladies of Wrestling federation
- A Mississippi show choir named Attaché Show Choir
