= FlashCP =

Copyright enforcement technology

FlashCP was a copy prevention technology for the storage of electronic materials (e.g. e-books). Originally developed under the trademark "BookLocker", SanDisk acquired the technology in 2005 with the purchase of Israeli-based privately held company "MDRM".

FlashCP is primarily used on USB flash drives to provide students with storage capabilities of copyrighted material, while preventing sharing of such material. This is done through the use of Windows software that must be installed to use the FlashCP capability of the drive. The software interfaces with proprietary software in the flash drive. SanDisk manufactured a flash drive using the FlashCP technology, the 256MB Cruzer "Freedom Drive".
