= ULLtraDIMM =

Solid state storage device

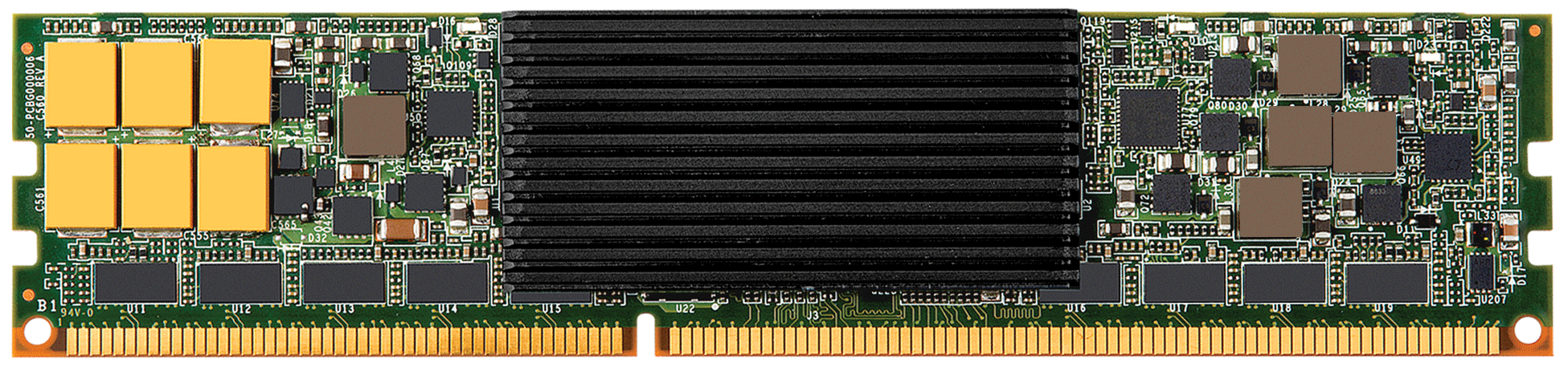
ULLtraDIMM Front

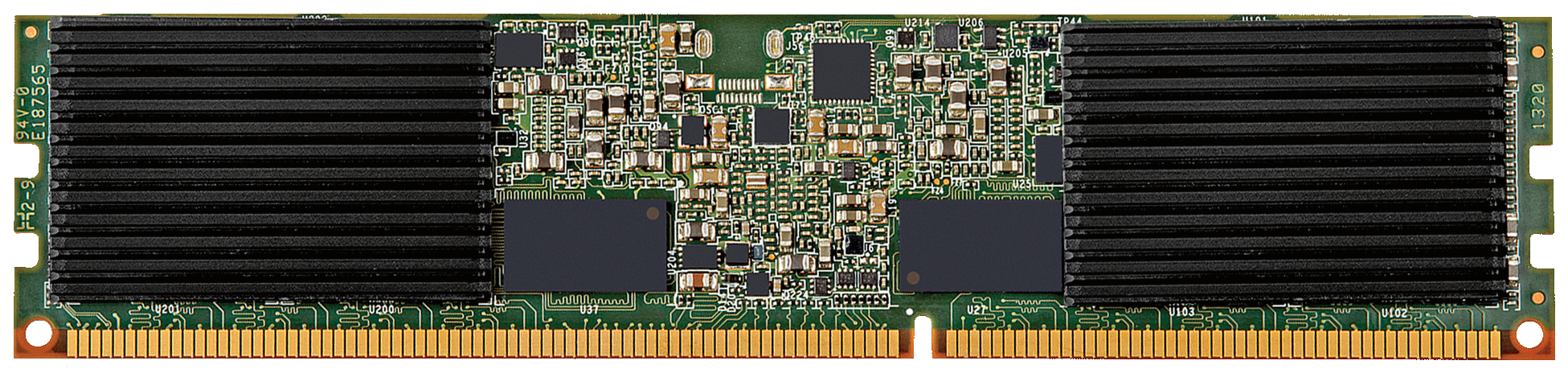
ULLtraDIMM Back

The ULLtraDIMM is a solid state storage device from SanDisk that connects flash storage directly onto the DDR3 memory bus. Unlike traditional PCIe Flash Storage devices, the ULLtraDIMM is plugged directly into an industry standard RDIMM memory bus slot in a server.

This design and connection location provides deterministic (consistent) known latency to enable applications to be streamlined for improved performance.

The ULLtraDIMM is compatible with the JEDEC MO-269 DDR3 RDIMM specification.

The ULLtraDIMM supports support both 1.35 V and 1.5 V operation from 800–1333 MHz, and 1.5 V @ 1600 MHz DDR3 transfer rates. DDR3 ECC bits are used to verify the integrity of the data being sent across memory bus. The ULLtraDIMM will verify that correct ECC is received and, if there are errors, the device driver will re-run the transfer. The CPU treats the ECC from the ULLtraDIMM in the same manner as ECC from a memory DIMM, single symbol errors are corrected. The DDR3 ECC bits are not stored in the flash array. A separate ECC scheme is used for protecting data in the flash array. Memory interleaving of standard RAM is not affected by the presence of ULLtraDIMMs.

UEFI/BIOS updates are required to properly recognize an ULLtraDIMM in the system as a block device and not halt the bootstrap sequence.
