= Schooner Information Technology =

Information technology company

- Type: Subsidiary
- Industry: Web 2.0 Cloud Computing Data centers
- Founded: Menlo Park, California (2007)
- Founder: John Busch; Tom McWilliams
- Headquarters: Sunnyvale, California, U.S.
- Parent: SanDisk

Schooner Information Technology, Inc. provided database management system appliances for Web 2.0, cloud computing and data centers. It was headquartered in Sunnyvale, California, and acquired by SanDisk in 2012.

== History ==
Schooner Information Technology was founded by John R. Busch and Thomas M. McWilliams in February 2007. An investment of about $7 million in November 2007 included CMEA Ventures and Redpoint Ventures. The investment was increased to $15 million by November 2008.

Schooner appliances were designed to reduce total cost of ownership and be compatible with Memcached and MySQL. The Schooner appliances were marketed for Web 2.0, cloud computing and enterprise data centers.

After the 2008 financial crisis, Schooner was one of only a few to receive venture investment. On April 13, 2009, Schooner announced IBM would resell its appliance for MySQL Enterprise and one for Memcached. Another round of $20 million investment was announced in July 2009, led by Menlo Ventures.

Schooner's appliances were originally built on the IBM System x server with Nehalem dual four-core processors from Intel Corporation, 64 GB of dynamic random access memory, 512 GB of Intel X25-E solid-state drives, four Gigabit Ethernet ports and in a 2 rack unit appliance, with the ability to expand.

By early 2011, the tie to IBM hardware ended. Instead, the product was sold as software that could run on other brands of computers. In April 2011, Schooner announced support for using cluster computing with the InnoDB technology. SanDisk acquired the company with undisclosed terms in June 2012 and it operated as a subsidiary of SanDisk. The Memcached software was marketed with the name Membrain through about mid-2014.
