= Pua Khein-Seng =

Malaysian inventor

Yang Berbahagia Dato' Pua Khein Seng DSPN
- 潘健成
- Born: 29 June 1974 (age 52); Sekinchan, Selangor, Malaysia
- Citizenship: Malaysian
- Education: National Chiao Tung University
- Occupations: CEO, Phison Electronics Corporation
- Children: 1

Chinese name
- Chinese: 潘健成
- Hanyu Pinyin: Pān Jiànchéng
- Hokkien POJ: Phoaⁿ Kiān-sêng

Pua Khein-Seng (Chinese: 潘健成; Pe̍h-ōe-jī: Phoaⁿ Kiān-sêng; born 29 June 1974) is a Malaysian businessman known for being the inventor of the USB flash drive. In an interview with The Star, the CEO of Phison Electronics Corp based in Taiwan had incorporated the world's first single chip USB flash drive. He is regarded as the "father of pendrive".

== Early life ==
Pua was born parents of a modest background and raised in Sekinchan, Selangor, Malaysia, He completed his schooling at Pin Hwa High School, Klang, Selangor. Pua received his undergraduate education in electrical control engineering at the National Chiao Tung University, Taiwan and has since then resided in Taiwan.

== Honours ==
- Penang
  - Officer of the Order of the Defender of State (DSPN) – Dato' (2012)

== See also ==
- Tensor Tech
