= Phison =

Taiwanese electronics company

Phison Electronics Corporation
- Type: Public
- Traded as: TPEx: 8299
- Industry: Solid-state drives
- Founded: November 2000; 26 years ago
- Headquarters: Zhunan, Miaoli, Taiwan
- Key people: Khein-Seng Pua (Board Chairman, CEO); Aw Yong Chee Kong (President)
- Products: NAND flash memory Flash memory controllers
- Number of employees: 4000
- Website: www.phison.com/en/

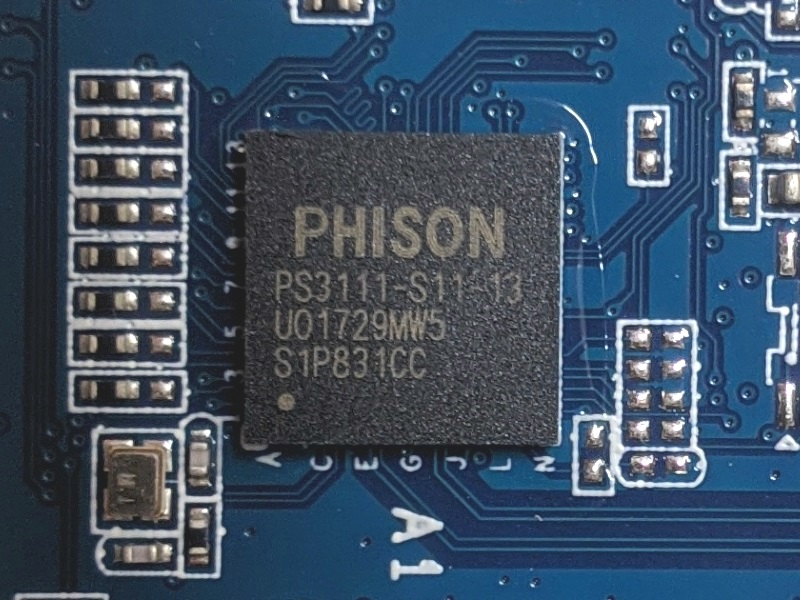
Phison SSD controller

Phison Electronics Corporation (Chinese: 群聯電子; pinyin: Qúnlián Diànzǐ) is a Taiwanese public electronics company that primarily designs, manufactures and sells controllers for NAND flash memory chips. These are integrated into flash-based products such as USB flash drives, memory cards, and solid-state drives (SSDs).

Phison is a member of the Open NAND Flash Interface Working Group (ONFI), which aims to standardize the hardware interface to NAND flash chips.

== History ==
Phison was founded in 2000 by Datuk Pua Khein Seng and four others.

Phison claims to have produced the earliest single-chip USB flash removable disk, dubbed a "pen drive."

In early October 2014, security researchers Adam Caudill and Brandon Wilson publicly released source code to a firmware attack against Phison USB controller ICs. This code implements the BadUSB exploit described in July 2014 at the Black Hat Briefings conference.

In August 2019, Phison announced that they would be releasing PS-50 series chips, e.g., PS5018-E18, that are designed to support PCIe 4.0 NVMe (non-volatile memory express) solid-state drives (SSDs). With such technology, the chips built on the NVMe SSDs have read and write speed of up to 7,000 MBs per second.

In late 2020, Phison started shipping their E18 for high-end NVMe SSDs.

In January 2021, Phison announced that they were planning to introduce a pair of USB flash drive controllers for high-end portable SSDs, designed to compete against current solutions that combine a USB to NVMe bridge chip with a standard NVMe SSD controller. Phison also released a new entry-level DRAM-less NVMe SSD controller in 2021. For portable SSDs, Phison introduced the U17 and U18 controllers. For NVMe SSDs, Phison introduced the E21T controller in 2021, their latest DRAM-less NVMe controller. This is a follow-up to the E19T controller, which had seen very little use in retail consumer SSDs but has actually been outselling their high-end E16 PCIe 4.0 controller due to strong demand from OEMs.

In January 2022, Phison introduced the E26 SSD controller, with higher transfer speeds than previous controllers.

In April 2022, Phison announced a long term partnership with data storage company Seagate to develop and distribute enterprise NVMe SSDs.

== Subsidiaries ==
The company set up a research and development (R&D) centre named "Phisontech" in Bayan Lepas, Penang, Malaysia in 2012, that was involved in the design and development of flash memory applications. The R&D centre was later closed down in 2019 due to talent loss, work culture and lack of supporting local businesses. In 2024, Phison started a new company called "MaiStorage" in Puchong, Selangor, Malaysia, involved in integrated circuit (IC) design and computer data storage technologies in data centres, electric vehicles, and generative AI.

== See also ==
- List of companies of Taiwan
