= Gerakan Nelajan Marhaenis =

Organization of fishermen in Indonesia

Gerakan Nelajan Marhaenis (English: Marhaenist Fishermen's Movement) was an organization of fishermen in Indonesia, linked to the Indonesian Nationalist Party (PNI). GNM was part of the Marhaen Mass Movement (GMM). GNM held its first congress in Tegal in July 1965.
