= Lexar =

Brand of flash memory and DRAM products

Lexar International
- Type: Subsidiary
- Industry: Memory storage
- Founded: 1996; 30 years ago
- Founders: John Reimer, Mike Liccardo, Paul Wenz, Petro Estakhri
- Headquarters: San Jose, California, U.S.
- Products: SD card USB flash drives Solid-state drives Flash memory CompactFlash cards Card readers XQD
- Parent: Shenzhen Longsys Electronics Co., Ltd. (2017–present)
- Website: www.lexar.com

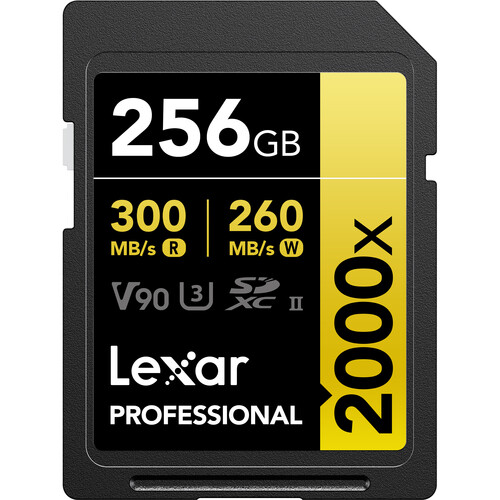
Lexar Professional 2000x SDXC UHS-II Card GOLD Series 256GB V90

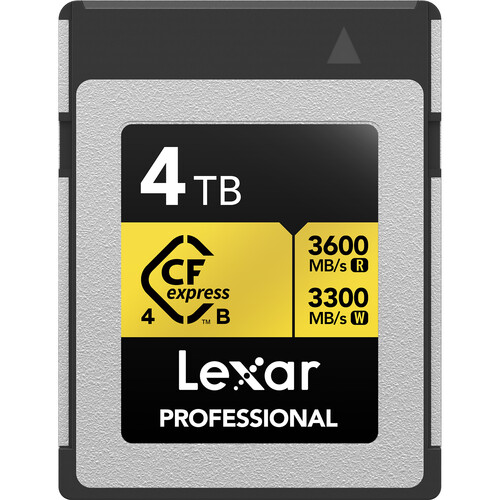
Lexar Professional GOLD CFexpress 4.0 Type B Memory Card 4TB

Lexar International is an American computer technology company based in San Jose, California, that specializes in designing flash memory products. Since 2017, it has been a subsidiary of Shenzhen, China-based flash memory company Longsys.

The Lexar "JumpDrive" trademark was often used synonymously with the term USB flash drives when the technology was first adopted.

== History ==
=== Early years (1996–2006) ===
Lexar was founded by Petro Estakhri and Mike Assar in 1996 as a spin-off from Cirrus Logic. Products manufactured by Lexar include SD cards, CompactFlash cards, USB flash drives, card readers and solid-state drives. Once a division of Cirrus Logic, Lexar leveraged its parent company's experience in building ATA controllers in developing its own flash controllers.

In 2002, Lexar filed a lawsuit against Toshiba, alleging that Toshiba had copied its NAND flash memory technology. In 2005, a California jury initially awarded Lexar $465 million in damages, after which Toshiba filed an appeal. In September 2006, following Lexar’s acquisition by Micron Technology, Toshiba agreed to settle all outstanding litigation by purchasing certain patents and rights previously owned by Lexar for $288 million.

=== Under Micron ownership (2006–2017) ===
Micron Technology acquired Lexar in 2006. In September 2007, Lexar extended its agreement with Eastman Kodak Company to develop and market Kodak-branded flash memory products worldwide.

On June 26, 2017, Micron (the then-owner of the brand) announced it was to discontinue the Lexar retail removable media storage business and put part or all of the business up for sale.

=== Under Longsys ownership (2017–present) ===
On August 31, 2017, Longsys, a flash memory company based in Shenzhen, China acquired the Lexar brand and trademark rights.

In 2018, Lexar reentered the flash storage market.

In January 2019, the company unveiled the first SD card with a storage capacity of 1 terabyte (TB).

In December 2019, Lexar demonstrated a prototype 7.5 GB/s PCIe 4.0 SSD which is set to be the world's fastest consumer SSD.

In April 2020, Lexar released its world's smallest memory card (nCARD) featuring Xtacking tech from Yangtze Memory Technology (YMTC).

In June 2020, Lexar announced its entry to the DRAM market by unveiling seven different DDR4-2666 memory kits for mainstream laptops and desktops. Lexar also plans to release faster, 3000 MHz and 3200 MHz memory kits in the future, along with kits "with heatsinks and RGB lighting", targeting gamers and enthusiasts.

== USB FlashCard ==
USB FlashCard is a flash memory card format developed by Lexar, and announced on December 13, 2004.

There is a wide range of existing memory card formats such as SD, xD, and CompactFlash; the major advantage of USB FlashCard is that the cards are in fact standard USB flash drives. The USB FlashCard uses a modified USB Type A plug which keeps the total thickness of the card to under 4.5 mm. Because of its small size and USB compatibility, a USB FlashCard could, for example, be accessed by either a digital camera or a modern personal computer without the need for a card reader.

Lexar has published the specifications for its USB FlashCard form factor on its website in an open and royalty-free format, in the hopes that other memory card and portable device manufacturers will adopt it.

The specifications for the USB FlashCard published by Lexar show its dimensions to be 31.75 mm × 12 mm × 4.5 mm. The volume is comparable to the widely adopted SD cards (32 mm × 24 mm × 2.1 mm). The USB FlashCard has nearly the same length as the SD card, but is half as wide, and approximately twice as thick.
