= Sandisk =

American digital storage corporation

Coordinates: 37°25′07.6″N 121°55′25.9″W

Sandisk Corporation

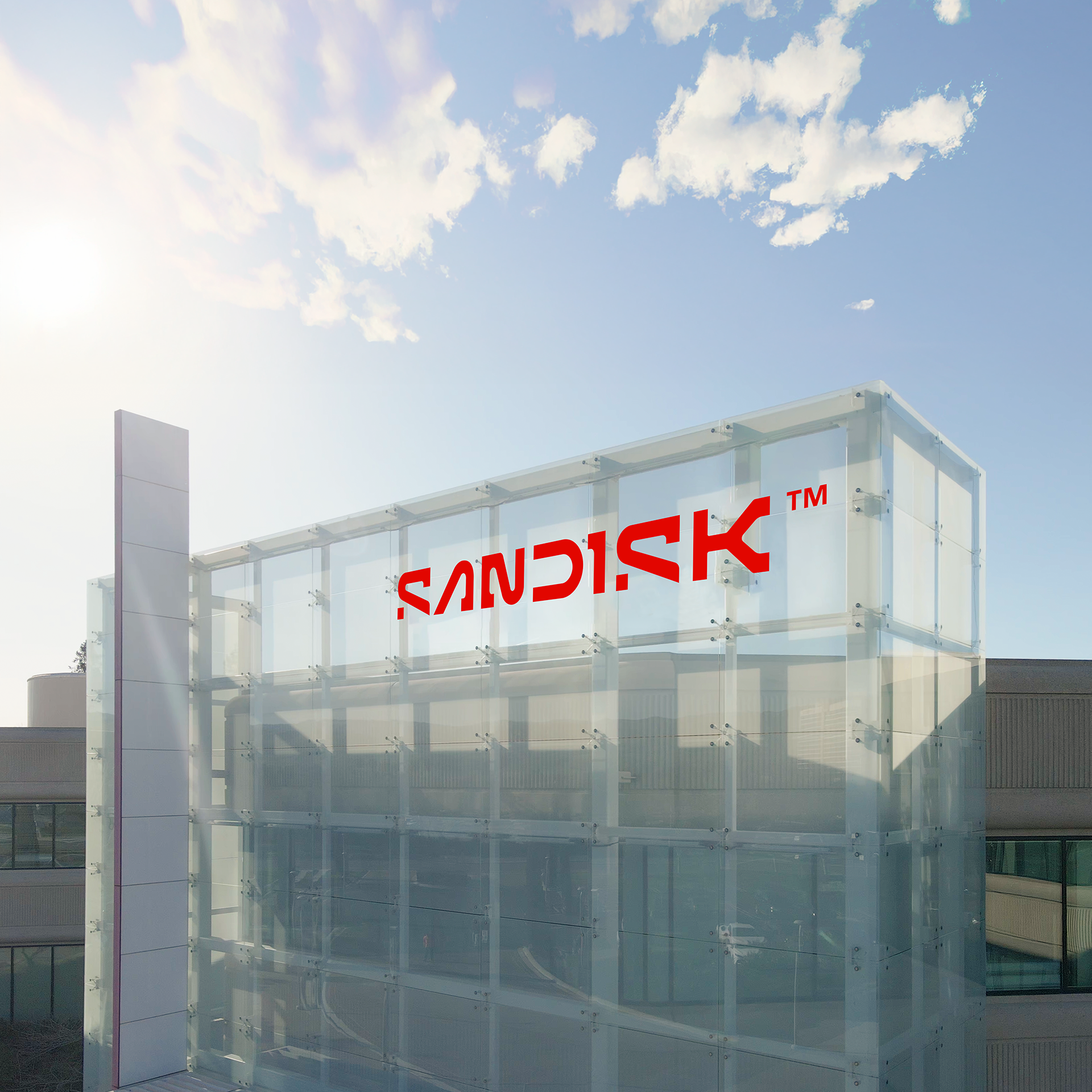
- SanDisk's headquarters in Milpitas, California
- Formerly: SunDisk Corporation (1988‍–‍1995); SanDisk Corporation (1995‍–‍2016); SanDisk LLC (2016‍–‍2024)
- Type: Public
- Traded as: Nasdaq: SNDK; Nasdaq-100 component; S&P 100 component; S&P 500 component
- ISIN: US80004C2008
- Industry: Computer hardware
- Founded: June 1, 1988; 38 years ago
- Founders: Eli Harari; Sanjay Mehrotra; Jack Yuan
- Headquarters: Milpitas, California, United States
- Area served: Worldwide
- Key people: David Goeckeler (CEO)
- Products: Computer data storage
- Revenue: ▲US$7.355 billion (2025)
- Operating income: ▼US$−1.28 billion (2025)
- Net income: ▼US$−1.64 billion (2025)
- Total assets: ▼US$12.99 billion (2025)
- Total equity: ▼US$9.216 billion (2025)
- Number of employees: 11,000 (2025)
- Parent: Western Digital (2016–2025)
- Website: www.sandisk.com

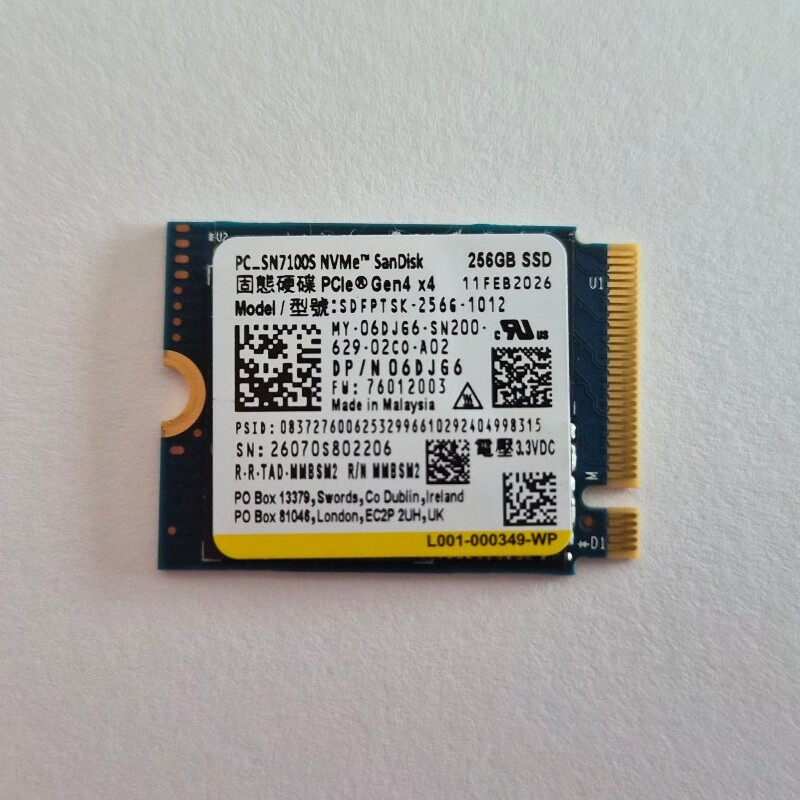
A SanDisk 256GB PC SN7100s 256GB SSD

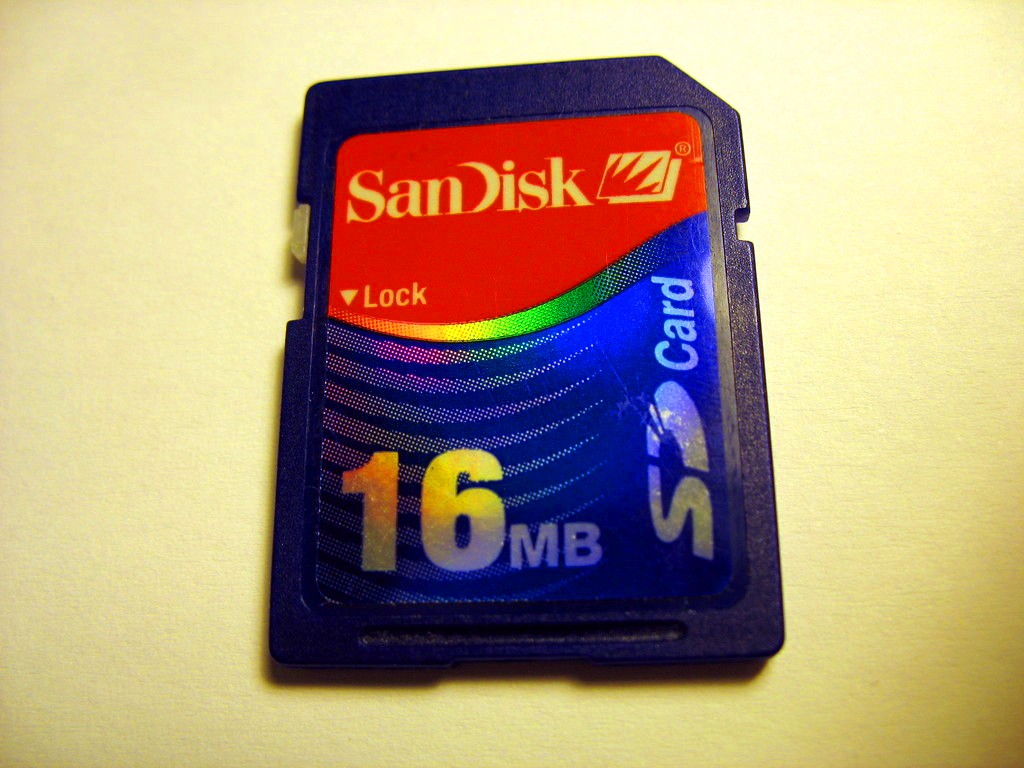
Sandisk SD 16MB

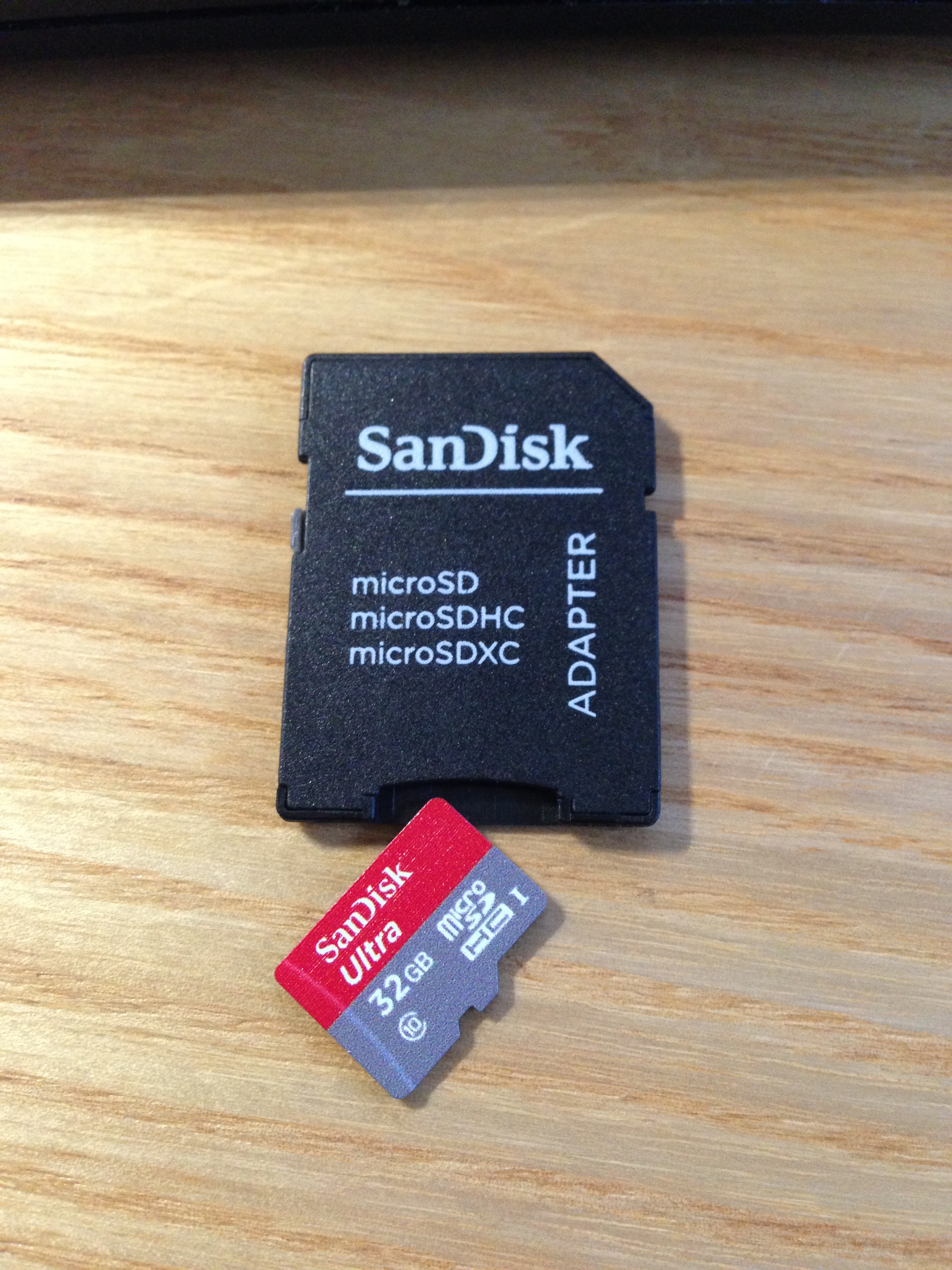
SanDisk Ultra 32GB MicroSD card with Adapter

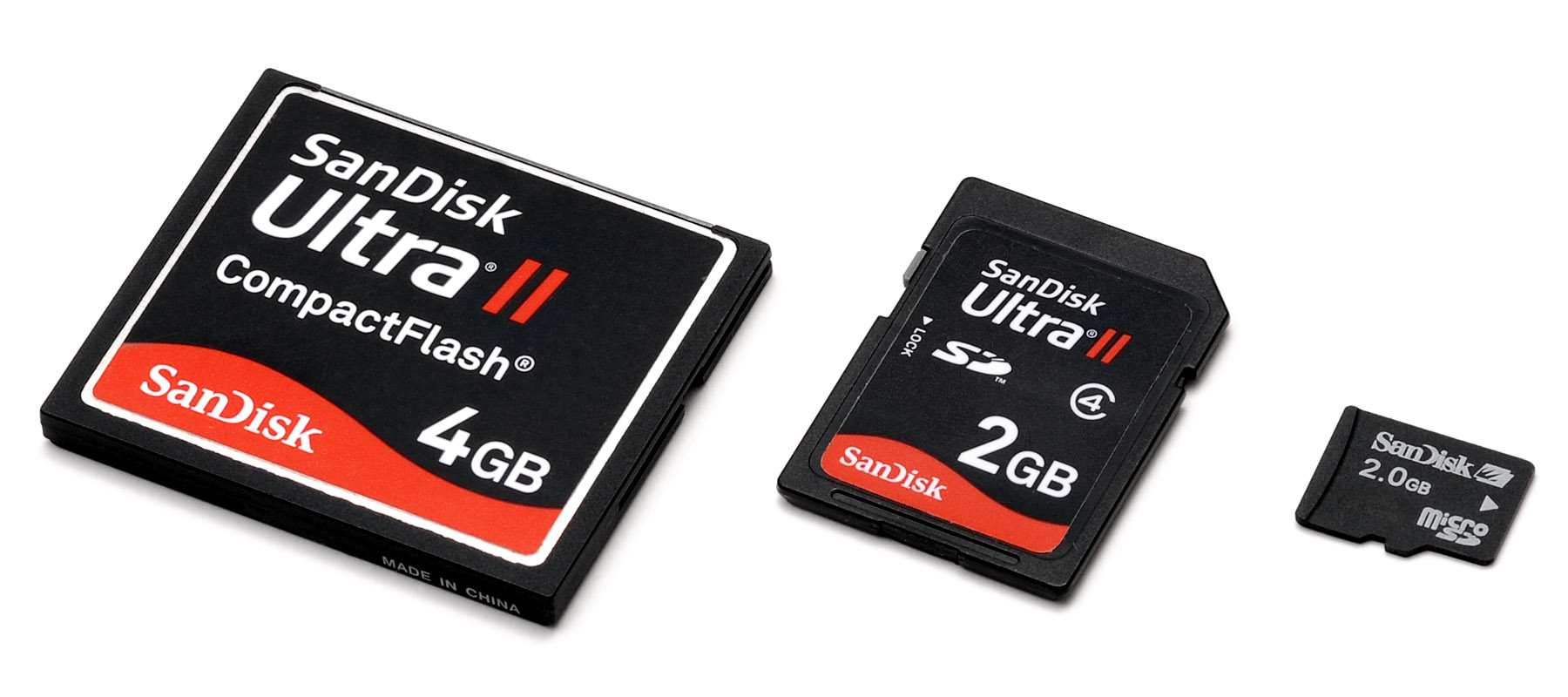
Comparison of three different size memory cards from SanDisk: compact flash, SD card and micro SD.

Sandisk Corporation (formerly SunDisk Corporation and SanDisk Corporation) is an American multinational computer semiconductor company based in Milpitas, California.

Founded in 1988, it designs and manufactures flash memory products, including memory cards, USB flash drives, and solid-state drives (SSDs).

== History ==
The company was originally founded in 1988 as SunDisk by Eli Harari, Sanjay Mehrotra, and Jack Yuan.

Harari developed the Floating Gate EEPROM which proved the practicality, reliability and endurance of semiconductor-based data storage. The three co-founders had the goal of developing and selling solid state storage products that could hold data for years without requiring external power.

In 1991, SunDisk produced the first flash-based solid-state drive (SSD) in a 2.5-inch hard disk drive form factor for IBM with a 20 MB capacity priced at about $1,000.

In 1992, SunDisk introduced FlashDisk, a series of memory cards made for the PCMCIA or PC Card form factor, so they could be inserted into the expansion slots of many laptops and handheld PCs of the time. Unlike other similar products at the time, FlashDisks did not require a battery to store their contents. The company discontinued their production in 2002, and the highest capacity model had 8 gigabytes of capacity.

On November 8, 1995, SunDisk changed its name to SanDisk to avoid confusion with Sun Microsystems, and went public under the new name via an initial public offering, marking the company's first tenure on the Nasdaq under the stock ticker SNDK. 16 million shares were sold at a price of $10.00 per share.

On May 10, 2000, the Toshiba Corporation of Japan and the SanDisk Corporation said that they would jointly form a new semiconductor company to produce advanced flash memory, primarily for digital cameras.

In 2005 SanDisk entered the digital audio player market with the release of its first flash-based MP3 player, the SanDisk Sansa e100. As soon as 2006, they became the second largest maker of digital audio players in the United States behind Apple.

In October 2005, SanDisk acquired Matrix Semiconductor. In July 2006, SanDisk acquired M-Systems. In May 2011, SanDisk acquired Pliant Technology, a manufacturer of solid state drives, for $327 million. In February 2012, SanDisk acquired FlashSoft. In June 2012, SanDisk acquired Schooner Information Technology, developer of the flash-optimized database software SchoonerSQL and caching software Membrain. In July 2013, SanDisk acquired SMART Storage Systems, a producer of SSDs for the enterprise market, for $307 million. In June 2014, SanDisk acquired Fusion-io, a producer of flash memory for enterprise data centers, for $1.1 billion.

In 2012, the Enough Project ranked SanDisk the third best of the 24 consumer electronics companies surveyed for their "progress on conflict minerals".

In 2014, SanDisk co-founder Harari won the National Medal of Technology and Innovation from President Barack Obama for his innovations and contributions to flash memory storage.

On January 8, 2015, NexGen Storage, which had been acquired by Fusion-io, was spun out as an independent company; it would be acquired by Pivot3 in January 2016.

In October 2015, Western Digital announced its intent to acquire SanDisk for $19 billion. The acquisition was completed on May 12, 2016; the valuation was lowered to $16 billion after Chinese company Unisplendour pulled out of an agreement to acquire a 15% stake in WD.

In October 2023, Western Digital announced its intent to spin off its flash storage businesses as a new public company under the SanDisk name, leaving WD focused solely on hard drives. In addition to SanDisk-branded products, the spin-off would also include all flash storage products that were marketed under the WD branding. The company began preparations for the split in October 2024, when all product listings and information for WD-branded flash storage products were moved under the SanDisk website. In December 2024, SanDisk unveiled a new pixel-inspired logo, replacing a design used in various forms since 1995; it also renamed itself as Sandisk, eschewing the use of camel case in its name.

The split was completed on February 24, 2025, with Sandisk relisted on the NASDAQ for the first time since its 2016 acquisition by WD (under the same ticker symbol from its 1995 IPO to its 2016 acquisition by WD, SNDK), and WD CEO David Goeckeler moving to the new company. WD continues to hold an equity stake in Sandisk, but had trimmed it to around $1 billion by early 2026 and planned to sell it all off over time. In January 2026, it was announced that the WD-branded "Blue" and "Black" SSDs products by Sandisk would be rebranded as "SanDisk Optimus" and "Optimus GX" respectively, maintaining the same model numbers.

The company's stock was re-added to the NASDAQ-100 index on April 20, 2026.

An inconsistency has been identified within the manufacturer brand strings reported by modern SanDisk NVMe Solid-State Drives (SSDs). This variance creates an unexpected discrepancy in system reporting tools and device identification logs. For example, for the Sandisk PC SN5100 NVMe SSD, their device metadata returns the vendor/brand string formatted as "Sandisk" (lowercase "d"). However, for the SanDisk PC SN7100 NVMe SSD, their device metadata returns the vendor/brand string formatted as "SanDisk" (uppercase "D"). While this variation does not impact the mechanical performance or transfer speeds of the hardware, it introduces minor challenges for automated system inventory scripts and hardware management software. Parsing tools that rely on exact string matching may misidentify these components as originating from different vendors due to case-sensitive evaluation constraints. This discrepancy most likely stems from conflicting legacy firmware templates utilized during the corporate transition and consolidation of the Western Digital and SanDisk storage lines.

== Financial indicators ==
	2022	2023	2024	2025	2026
Total revenue (USD bn)	9.8	6.1	6.7	7.4	20.3
Operating income (USD bn)	1.2	−1.3	−0.4	0.5	12.5
Net income (USD bn)	1.1	−2.1	−0.7	−1.6	11.4
Total assets (USD bn)	15.7	13.8	13.5	13.0	22.5
Total equity (USD bn)	13.0	11.4	11.1	9.2	15.7
Number of employees			12,000	11,000	11,100

== Logos ==
1995–2007

2007–2024

2024–present

== See also ==
- Eye-Fi
- FlashCP
- SanDisk portable media players
- SanDisk Professional
- USB flash drive security
- U3
- ULLtraDIMM
