= PNY =

American computer hardware manufacturer

PNY Technologies, Inc.
- Type: Private
- Industry: Flash memory; Memory upgrades; Video cards; Solid state drives; PowerPacks
- Founded: 1985; 41 years ago in Brooklyn, New York, U.S.
- Founder: Gadi Cohen
- Headquarters: Parsippany-Troy Hills, New Jersey, U.S.
- Products: Nvidia GeForce and Quadro graphics cards; Attaché USB flash drives; Flash memory cards; PC memory upgrades; Solid state drives; PowerPacks; HDMI cables; Computer locks
- Number of employees: 500+
- Website: www.pny.com

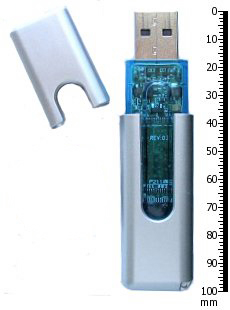
A 128 MB PNY Attaché USB flash drive (2004)

PNY Technologies, Inc., doing business as PNY, is an American manufacturer of flash memory cards, USB flash drives, solid state drives, memory upgrade modules, portable battery chargers, computer locks, cables, chargers, adapters, and consumer and professional graphics cards. The company is headquartered in Parsippany-Troy Hills, New Jersey.

PNY stands for "Paris, New York", as they used to trade memory modules between Paris and New York.

== History ==
PNY Electronics, Inc. was founded in Brooklyn, New York, in 1985 by Gadi Cohen as a company that bought and sold memory chips.

In 1996, the company was headquartered in Moonachie, New Jersey, and had a manufacturing production plant there, an additional plant in Santa Clara, California, and served Europe from a third facility in Bordeaux, France.

To emphasize its expansion into manufacturing new forms of memory and complementary products, the company changed its name to PNY Technologies, Inc. in 1997. The company has main offices in Parsippany, New Jersey; Santa Clara, California; Miami, Florida; Bordeaux, France, and Taiwan.

In 2009, the New Jersey Nets sold the naming rights of their practice jerseys to PNY. In 2011, PNY moved its global headquarters and main manufacturing facility to a 40+ acre location on Jefferson Road in Parsippany, NJ.

== Products ==
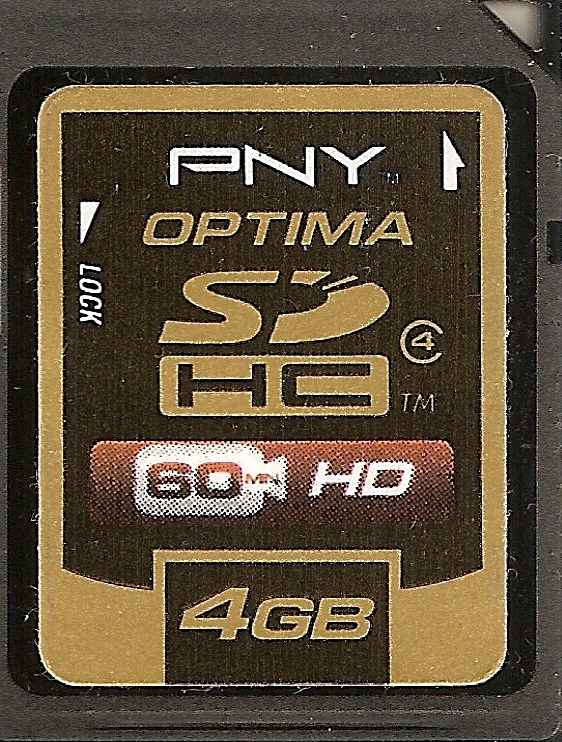
A 4 GB SDHC card

PNY is a memory and graphics technology company and manufacturer of computer peripherals, including the following products:

- Flash memory cards
- USB flash drives
- Solid state drives
- Memory upgrades
- NVIDIA GPUs (both Workstation and Consumer)
- HDMI cables
- DRAM modules
- Portable battery chargers
- HP Pendrive & MicroSD Cards

Legacy products:

- CD-R discs

PNY has introduced water-cooled video cards and themed USB flash drives that include full films.
