= Google Quick Search Box =

Application launcher and desktop search tool

- Developer: Google
- Preview release: 2.0.0.3789 / August 23, 2010
- Written in: Objective-C, Cocoa
- Operating system: Mac OS X 10.5 or later
- License: Apache License 2.0
- Website: code.google.com/p/qsb-mac/

Google Quick Search Box (GQSB) is an application launcher and desktop search tool developed by Google for Mac OS X computers. It allows users to search files, URLs, and contacts on their computer, as well as performing actions on the results.

== History and status ==
GQSB was first released as a developer preview on January 12, 2009. It is still in beta, and a new version is released approximately monthly. The releases follow the sequence of chemical elements from the periodic table. The first public release was named Scandium and As of August 2009 the current release is Cobalt. Like other Google products such as the Chrome browser, QSB is open-source software. However, just as with Chrome, Google distributes official builds with extra functionality. In the case of QSB, this includes plugin validation, auto-update, and Google-branded icons. Later it became a fully open source product, and just called Quick Search Box. In Mac OS X Snow Leopard, QSB has replaced Google Desktop.

== Comparisons to other products ==
QSB is similar to another Google product, Google Desktop. However, there are several key differences between the two products:

- Operating system compatibility: While Google Desktop is cross-platform, QSB is at present Mac-only software. Google currently has an app that allows users to search the web using the iPhone.
- Search methodology: Google Desktop maintains its own index of files for searching. It also indexes Gmail messages. QSB uses macOS's built-in indexing technology, Spotlight. Because of this, QSB is less resource-intensive than Google Desktop. However, there are drawbacks. QSB does not support indexing of Gmail messages (because Spotlight doesn't), and some aspects do not function if Spotlight is disabled.
- Search philosophy: Google Desktop offers a search-only paradigm. On the other hand, QSB allows actions to be defined, which can be applied to search result. For example, after locating a file in QSB, it is possible to select among "open," "get info," "move to trash" and other actions. In this respect, it is similar to another macOS software tool, Quicksilver. The developer of Quicksilver, Nicholas Jitkoff is employed by Google and is one of the lead developers of QSB.
- Extensibility: Both QSB and Google Desktop offer plugin APIs. However, in QSB it is possible to add both search result plugins and action plugins (integrating with the actions described immediately above). Google indicates that there is more leeway to expand QSB.

== Features ==
In addition to file search, QSB is distributed with a suite of plugins that allow additional functionality. These include:

- Bookmarks from common browsers (Firefox, Camino, Safari)
- Definitions from the operating system dictionary
- Results of simple calculations
- Integration with Google Documents and Picasa

== Criticisms ==
Users have noted that the functionality as compared to Desktop is reduced, especially in the area of in-document text searching, Gmail message searching and web history searching.
