= List of dock applications =

The following is a list of dock applications.

Dock application	Platform(s)	Software license	Notes
OS X Dock	OS X	Proprietary	The standard dock bundled with OS X.
DragThing	OS X	Proprietary	Shareware Dock replacement for OS X with many features.
Appetizer	Microsoft Windows	Open source	Customizable dock with support for plugins and skins.
ObjectDock	Microsoft Windows	Proprietary (Freeware and Shareware)	Copy of the OS X dock for Windows offered in both Freeware and Shareware forms. Support for docklets (plugins).
RocketDock	Microsoft Windows	Proprietary	Copy of the OS X dock for Windows. Support for docklets (plugins).
SliderDock	Microsoft Windows	Open source	3D wheel shaped application launcher which focus on rotation to access an application without moving the mouse.
Avant Window Navigator	Unix-like	Open source	Copy of the OS X dock for Unix-like systems. Support for docklets (plugins).
GNOME Do	Unix-like	Open source	Application launcher, with Dock option. Support for docklets (plugins).
gDesklets	Unix-like	Open source	GNOME program which provides support for desktop widgets. Support for docklets (plugins).
Docky	Linux	Open source	Copy of the OS X dock for Unix-like systems. Support for docklets (plugins).
