= XWindows Dock =

XWindows Dock (A.K.A. XWD)
- Dock your mind, Stack the world.
- Developer(s): Vladimir Likhonos (Ukraine)
- Stable release: 2.0.3 / November 15, 2010; 14 years ago
- Platform: Microsoft Windows
- Type: Dock
- License: Creative Commons
- Website: xwdock.aqua-soft.org

XWindows Dock was a clone of the dock in Mac OS X Leopard for Windows. It is freely available under Creative Commons license.

== Features ==
- 2D & 3D Full Skin Customization Design.
- Stacks like in Leopard.
- Minimize Windows. Supports two effects: Default and Genie.
- Live reflections of icons and windows.
- Customizable sounds.
- Bounce effect for icons and stacks.
- Skin Maker Included.
- XML for Language file creation.
- Gallery view for pictures and documents
- Docklets for special purposes such as a calendar and weather docklet.
- Configurable number of zoomed icons.
- Folder monitoring.
- Option to show icon shadow, and to define opacity and blur of the shadow.
- Auto-update.

== See also ==
- Dock (computing)
