= RocketDock =

Application launcher

- Developer: Punk Labs
- Stable release: 1.3.5 / 3 September 2008
- Platform: Microsoft Windows
- Type: Dock
- License: Creative Commons
- Website: RocketDock

RocketDock is an application launcher developed by PolyVector and Skunkie of Punk Labs, in collaboration with artist Zachary Denton Q. It is designed for Windows and offers a dock similar to the one found in the Mac OS X Aqua graphical user interface. RocketDock is available for free under a Creative Commons license and is distributed by Punk Labs, which was previously known as Punk Software.

RocketDock allows users to see live updates of minimized windows, much like in Mac OS X. In Windows Vista, it can also display live thumbnail updates on the taskbar. Additionally, it is compatible with MobyDock, ObjectDock, RK Launcher, and Y'z Dock skins, and is compatible with and borrows from Stardock ObjectDock's publicly published Docklet API.

The RocketDock had a community where users could upload and share skins, icons, docklets, wallpapers, and other application customization resources. However, PunkLabs closed the RocketDock gallery on 6 August 2018.

== See also ==
- Dock (computing)
- Objectdock
- List of dock applications
