= Deskbar =

Deskbar may refer to:

- A software user interface for Google Desktop embedded in the taskbar that mainly consists of a Google search textfield
- Deskbar, a taskbar equivalent for BeOS currently provided by the OpenTracker project
- Deskbar, a fork of the BeOS Deskbar for the Haiku operating system.
- DeskBar, a hidden feature in Windows 98.
- Deskbar, an applet for the GNOME desktop environment.
