= Synapse (disambiguation) =

A synapse is a functional junction used for communication between neurons and other cells in the nervous system.

Synapse may also refer to:

== Computing and information systems ==
- Azure Synapse, a fully managed cloud data warehouse
- Peltarion Synapse, a component-based integrated development environment for neural networks and adaptive systems
- Synapse (software), a free and open-source application launcher for Linux
- Synapse Audio Software, German software company that develops music production software for Mac OS and Microsoft Windows platforms
- Synapse.org, an open source scientific collaboration platform
- Razer Synapse, a software from Razer

== Companies ==
- Synapse Financial Technologies, a fintech company
- Synapse Group, a marketing company

== Science ==
- Chemical synapse, in neurobiology
- Electrical synapse, in electrophysiology
- Immunological synapse, in immunology
- SyNAPSE (Systems of Neuromorphic Adaptive Plastic Scalable Electronics), a DARPA project
- Synapse, Fujifilm Medical Systems Picture archiving and communication system application

== Publications ==
- Synapse (journal), a neurology journal
- Synapse: The Magazine of the University of Nevada School of Medicine (online)
- Synapse Magazine, produced by the Chester County (PA) Hospital and Health System (online)
- Synapse (magazine), an electronic music magazine published 1976–1979
- The Synapse, Oberlin College science magazine
- Synapse (newspaper), student newspaper for the University of California, San Francisco

== Entertainment ==
- Synapse Films, a DVD releasing company specializing in cult and hard-to-find movies
- Synapse Software, an American computer game development and publishing company active during the early-1980s
- Celestial Synapse, musical event held at the Fillmore West on the evening of 19 February 1969
- Usurp Synapse, a screamo band from Indiana
- Synapse (film), a 2015 science fiction film
- Synapse, the fictional communications software in the 2001 film Antitrust (film)
- Synapse, song by British post-grunge band Bush on the album Razorblade Suitcase
- Synapse (video game), a 2023 virtual reality video game released for the PlayStation VR2
- Synapse (character), Marvel Comics characters

== See also ==
- Synaps, series of Steinberger electric guitars
- Synap, online assessment and learning platform
- Synapsid, a group of animals that includes mammals and everything more closely related to mammals than to other living amniotes
- Synapsis, the pairing of two homologous chromosomes that occurs during meiosis
- Synopsis, a brief summary of the major points of a written work
- Psynapse (comics), a Marvel Comics villain fictional character
- SINAP (disambiguation)
