= Google Desktop =

Computer program

- The GDS Sidebar sat on the user's desktop and displayed relevant information (Google Desktop on Microsoft Windows Vista)
- Developer: Google
- Release: October 14, 2004; 21 years ago
- Final release: 5.9.1005.12335 / 14 September 2011; 15 years ago
- Written in: C++
- Operating system: Cross-platform
- Type: Desktop search
- License: Proprietary
- Website: desktop.google.com

Google Desktop was a computer program with desktop search capabilities, created by Google for Linux, Apple Mac OS X, and Microsoft Windows systems. It allowed text searches of a user's email messages, computer files, music, photos, chats, web pages viewed, and the ability to display "Google Gadgets" on the user's desktop in a sidebar.

In September 2011, Google announced it would discontinue a number of its products, including Google Desktop. The reason given was that "In the last few years, there's been a huge shift from local to cloud-based storage and computing, as well as the integration of search and gadget functionality into most modern operating systems. People now have instant access to their data, whether online or offline. As this was the goal of Google Desktop, the product will be discontinued."

== Features ==
As of January 2008, Google Desktop featured the following functionality:

=== Sidebar ===
A prominent feature of Google Desktop was the Sidebar, which held several common Gadgets and resided off to one side of the desktop. The Sidebar was available on the Windows and Linux versions of Google Desktop. The Sidebar came pre-installed with the following gadgets:

- Email – a panel which let one view their own Gmail messages.
- Scratch Pad – here the user could store notes; they were saved automatically
- Photos – displayed a slideshow of photos from the "My Pictures" folder (address could be changed)
- News – showed the latest headlines from Google News, and how long ago they were written. The News panel was personalized depending on the type of news that users read.
- Weather – showed the current weather for a location specified by the user.
- Web Clips – showed updated content from RSS and Atom web feeds.
- Google Talk – If Google Talk was installed, double clicking the window title would dock it to the user's sidebar.

Like the Windows Taskbar, the Google Desktop sidebar could be set to Auto-Hide mode, where it would only appear once the user moved the mouse cursor towards the side where it resided. If not on auto-hide, by default the sidebar would always take up about 1/6 – 1/9 of the screen (depending on the screen resolution), and other windows were forced to resize. However, the sidebar could be resized to take less space, and users could disable the "always on top" feature in the options. With the auto-hide feature on, the sidebar temporarily overlapped maximized windows.

Another feature that came with the Sidebar was alerts. When the Sidebar was minimized, new email and news could be displayed in a pop-up window above the Windows Taskbar.

=== Quick Find ===
Quick find box

When searching in the sidebar, deskbar or floating deskbar, Google Desktop displayed a "Quick Find" window. This window was filled with six (by default) of the most relevant results from the user's computer. These results updated as the user typed, and allowed use without having to open another browser window.

=== Deskbars ===
Deskbars were boxes which enabled searching directly from the desktop. Web results would open in a browser window, and selected computer results would be displayed in the "Quick Find" box (see above). A Deskbar could either be a fixed deskbar, which sat in the Windows Taskbar, or a Floating Deskbar which might be positioned anywhere on the desktop.

=== Email indexing ===
Google Desktop included plugins that allowed indexing and searching the contents of local Microsoft Outlook, IBM Lotus Notes, and Mozilla Thunderbird email databases, outside of the client applications' built-in search functions. For Lotus Notes, only local databases were indexed for searching. Google Desktop's email indexing feature was also integrated with Google's web-based email service, Gmail; it could index and search the email messages in Gmail accounts.

=== Gadgets and plug-ins ===
Desktop gadgets were interactive mini-applications that could be placed anywhere on the user's desktop – or docked in the Sidebar – to show new email, weather, photos, and personalized news. Google offered a gallery of pre-built gadgets for download on the official website. For developers, Google offered an SDK and an official blog for anyone who wanted to write gadgets or plug-ins for Google Desktop. An automated system created a developer hierarchy called the "Google Desktop Hall of Fame", where programmers could advance based on their gadgets' number and popularity.

The SDK also allowed third-party applications to make use of the search facilities provided by Google Desktop Search. For example, the file manager Directory Opus offered integrated Google Desktop Search support.

=== Results list: title metadata ===
Google Desktop's search results included a title field whose value varied according to the type of result. For files, the title was the filename; for web pages, it was the page title; and for email, it was the message subject.

The use of the "title" tag gave a significantly better user experience, since metadata titles (when present) are written in ordinary language, while file names are less communicative.

When the title metadata was missing from a file, Google Desktop reverted to use its filename.

== Release history ==
Google Desktop running on Mac OS X.

Google Desktop running on Red Hat Linux.

Google Desktop was originally developed to bring Google search technology to the desktop. Google Desktop received attention from researchers because it may have allowed reverse engineering of Google's proprietary search algorithm.

A centrally administered version, which integrated the user experience with the vendor's appliance, existed as well. Google Desktop was officially discontinued on September 14, 2011.

=== Microsoft Windows ===
- The first release of Google Desktop Search was released as a beta version on October 14, 2004.
- Version 2 was released as a beta version on August 22, 2005. The new feature that distinguished Desktop 2 from Desktop is the addition of Sidebar, a panel that displayed personalized information, which could be placed on either side of the Windows desktop and could display real-time news, e-mail, photos, stocks, and weather, among others. Sidebar included a search box that could search just the PC or Google's other search types (like Web, Images, News, Groups.) Google Desktop 2 graduated from beta on November 3, 2005. New features included a sidebar plug-in for Google Maps and more plug-in developer support.
- Google Desktop 3 Beta was released on February 9, 2006. It included support for searching multiple computers on a network. Google Desktop 3 graduated from beta on March 14, 2006. Notable in this version was the quick search box, which appeared anywhere on the desktop after pressing "control" twice.
- Google Desktop 4 Beta was released on May 10, 2006. It featured Google Gadgets, modules that could deliver an array of information. It also introduced an option to automatically remove deleted files from search results. Google Desktop 4 graduated from beta on June 27, 2006.
- Google Desktop v4.5 was released on November 14, 2006, adding a transparency aesthetic to the sidebar and "floating" gadgets. The graphic interface of the sidebar was also enhanced with more stylized icons for news, stocks, weather, photos, etc. Release 4.5 also added support for Windows Vista.
- Google Desktop v 5.1 (the first post-Desktop 5 Beta release) was made available for download on April 27, 2007.
- Google Desktop v 5.9 (5.9.0906.04286) was released July 8, 2009. It added support for the Chrome browser and was the last version mentioned in the release notes.
- Google Desktop v 5.9.0909.02235 added support for the Private Browsing features of Firefox 3 and Internet Explorer 8.
- Google Desktop v 5.9.1005.12335 was released in May 2010.

Google Desktop was discontinued entirely on September 14, 2011.

=== Mac ===
- In April 2007, Google released Desktop 1.0 for Mac OS X, which could function alongside the Spotlight search tool in Mac OS X v10.4.
- On November 29, 2007, Google released Desktop v1.4.0.826 beta for Mac OS X, which plugged into Dashboard for Gadgets support.
- Version 1.6 of the Mac version of Google Desktop did not function under Mac OS X Snow Leopard.

=== Linux ===
- Google released Desktop 1.0 for Linux on June 27, 2007. It featured the basic functionality of the Windows version and the sidebar functionality.
- Google added 64-bit support to the Google Desktop for Linux with version 1.1.1.0075, which was made available for download on December 18, 2007.
- Google Desktop for Linux version 1.2.0.0088 was released on April 11, 2008.

== Criticisms ==
=== Security ===
In February 2007, Yair Amit, of Watchfire, found a series of vulnerabilities in Google Desktop that could allow a malicious individual to achieve not only remote, persistent access to sensitive data, but in some cases full system control as well. The significant impact and the ease of exploitation forced Google to change some of Google Desktop's logic in Google Desktop version 5.

=== Privacy ===
The Electronic Frontier Foundation (EFF) had concerns that personal information on people's computers could readily be copied from their hard drives when using Google Desktop.

Google Desktop version 3 contained certain features that raised serious security and privacy concerns. Specifically the share across computers feature introduced the ability to search content from desktop to desktop. This would greatly increase the risk to users' privacy, as if this feature was enabled, files on an indexed computer would be copied to Google's servers. The EFF advised against using this feature.

Other more far reaching concerns arose around the packaging and end user license agreement – specifically the level of intrusion on the local machine and the disclaimers that users implicitly agree to future changes in the license agreement without actually being able to see them immediately.

=== Mail indexing ===
During the first half of 2009, a large number of Google Desktop users reported that the product stopped indexing suddenly, when the index file reached approximately 4GB in size. A full uninstall (including manually deleting the indexes) and then reinstall would fix the problem temporarily, but the problem would recur when the index file reached 4GB again. The problem was resolved as of Google Desktop Search version 5.9. Google Desktop did not index email or contacts in Outlook 2010.

By default, Google Desktop did not index email in Thunderbird 3.

== See also ==
- Alfred (Mac OS X)
- Desktop search
- DocFetcher (uses Java)
- Copernic Desktop Search
- Everything
- Google Drive
- Launchy
- List of desktop search engines
- List of Google services and tools
- Quicksilver (Mac OS X)
- Recoll
- Windows Search (component of Windows)
