= Gnome-Pie =

Linux application launcher software

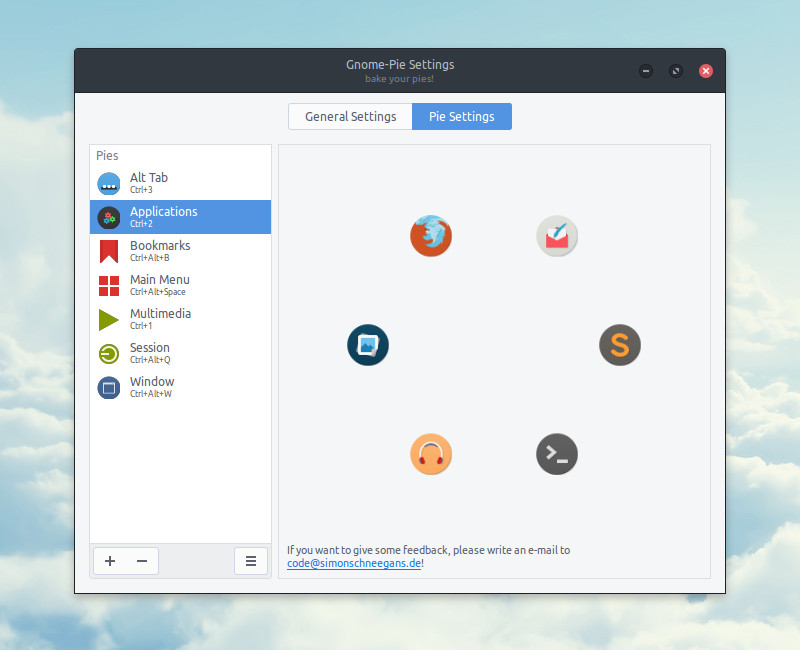
- Original author: Simon Schneegans
- Stable release: 0.7.2 / 30 October 2018; 7 years ago
- Written in: Vala
- Operating system: Linux
- Platform: GNOME
- License: MIT

Gnome-Pie is a circular application launcher for Linux created by Simon Schneegans.

It is made of several pies, each consisting of multiple slices. The user presses a keystroke, which opens the desired pie. By activating one of its slices, applications may be launched, key presses may be simulated or files can be opened. The user does not need to remember the name of an application – just the direction has to be remembered.

== License change ==
Version 0.7.1 and earlier was published under the GPL.

== See also ==
- Comparison of applications launchers
