= Quicksilver software =

Quicksilver Software may refer to:

- Quicksilver Software, Inc. - Irvine, CA based developer of computer and video games and other software
- Quicksilver (software) - Utility software program for Mac OS X
