= ASuite =

Open source software

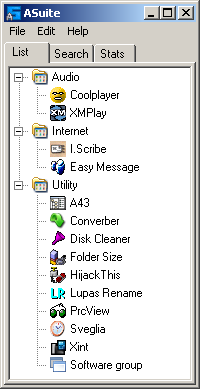
- Developer: SalvadorSoftware
- Release: April 11, 2005; 21 years ago
- Stable release: 2.0 / April 20, 2020; 6 years ago
- Written in: Delphi, XML
- Platform: Windows
- Type: application launcher (utility software)
- License: GPL
- Website: www.salvadorsoftware.com

ASuite is a free open source application launcher for Windows. It can be also used for applications in the PortableApps format and is an integral part of the Lupo PenSuite.

== Program usage ==
In the main window, under the List tab, user can be able to create and manage own customized application list. While Search tab will let you look for item names.

User can add applications to list manually (with Add function or Drag and drop) or using Scan File. ASuite lets you specify the path, what file types you want to scan for and what file types you want to exclude from your scan.

Other than the main window, user can execute applications from a graphic and skinnable menu Windows XP style. This menu can open it by clicking on ASuite icon in System tray.

Moreover, ASuite opens applications using relative path. So it can work on any storage device, like external hard disks and USB flash drives.

== See also ==
- Comparison of application launchers
