= WinRoll =

- WinRoll
- Developer: Wil Palma
- Release: April 10, 2003; 23 years ago
- Stable release: 2.0 / April 10, 2004; 22 years ago
- Written in: Assembly language
- Operating system: Microsoft Windows
- Type: Personalization
- License: zlib License
- Website: www.palma.com.au/winroll/

WinRoll is an free and open-source utility for Windows that allows the user to collapse, or "roll up", individual windows into their title bars (reminiscent of WindowShade on Classic Mac OS) in addition to other window management related features. The utility is compiled in assembly code, allowing it to be very compact. It was written by Wil Palma.

== Features ==
The purpose of WinRoll is to allow users to have many windows on the screen, while keeping them organized and manageable. The main feature of the program is enabling the user to "roll" windows up into their title bars. With the utility enabled, users may collapse windows with a single right click of the title bar. It also allows users to minimize programs to the tray, and to adjust the opacity of windows in order to make them semitransparent (or even fully transparent).

== History ==
WinRoll 1.0 was first released on April 10, 2003. It is unclear if it still maintained by Wil Palma. The most recent version, 2.0, was released on April 7, 2004. Being an open source program, its source code was freely available from the website. The website is now down.
