= Snarl (software) =

- Developer(s): Snarl Team
- Initial release: 2007; 18 years ago
- Stable release: 3.1 / 14 March 2014; 11 years ago
- Operating system: Windows 2000, Windows XP, Windows Vista, Windows 7
- Type: global notification system
- License: 2-clause BSD
- Website: snarl.fullphat.net

Snarl is a notification system for Microsoft Windows inspired by Growl that allows applications to display alpha-blended messages on the screen.

Unlike other forms of notification, Snarl does not hijack the current focused window, nor does it force the taskbar to be visible. Notifications can either be canceled by clicking on them, or left to disappear automatically if ignored for a period of time.

Snarl can display several messages at any one time; new messages are simply displayed beneath (or above) existing ones. An application can display any number of messages, and can update the content, icon, and time the message appears for any particular message at any time and explicitly remove the message if required. Applications can also request to be notified if a user clicks on a particular message.

Developers of other applications can include Snarl support in their applications with almost no effort at all - Snarl uses Windows window messaging functionality to show and hide notifications, making it accessible to any programming language from low-level pure C to high-level Visual Basic 6 or .NET-based environments.

== Features ==
- Unicode support
- Windows XP and Vista 32-bit & 64-bit support
- Multiple notifications support
- Notification position can be adjusted
- Substitute native Windows tooltip with Snarl Notification

== Applications supported by Snarl ==
- Commit Monitor
- dotWidget
- Firefox
- Floola
- foobar2000
- iTunes
- Jungle Disk
- Launchy
- Miranda NG (support up to 0.7.x)
- mIRC
- MusicBee
- Pidgin
- Process Controller
- Quintessential Player
- Ruby (programming language)
- Songbird
- Sunbird
- Spotify
- Task Coach
- Thunderbird
- Winamp
- Windows Live Messenger
- Witty

== Snarl-Specific applications ==
- SnarlClock (included with Snarl)
- SnarlTray (included with Snarl)
