= Comparison of desktop application launchers =

Computer programs that help users launch other software

An application launcher is a computer program that helps a user to locate and start other computer programs. An application launcher provides shortcuts to computer programs, and stores the shortcuts in one place so they are easier to find.

In the comparison of desktop application launchers below, each section treats a different desktop environment.

== Windows ==
These desktop application launchers work with Microsoft Windows operating systems only.

	Creator	Latest stable version	Release date	Software license	Open source	Programming language	Plug-in support
Appetizer	Laurent Cozic	1.4.6.494	February 13, 2010	GPL	Yes	C++, wxWidgets	Yes
ASuite	SalvadorSoftware	2.0	April 20, 2020	GPL	Yes	Delphi	No
Classic Shell	Ivo Beltchev	4.3.1	August 12, 2017	MIT	Yes	C++	Yes (Note: Via shell namespace extensions inside the menu)
Microsoft PowerToys Run	Microsoft	0.73.0	August 23, 2023	MIT	Yes	C++, C#	Yes
PortableApps.com Platform	Rare Ideas, LLC	15.0.2	May 17, 2018	GPL	Yes (Note: PortableApps.com branding is trademarked)	Delphi	No
SliderDock	Dimitri Roozendaal	1.21	October 11, 2010	Creative Commons	No	?	No

== Linux ==
These desktop application launchers work with Linux operating systems only.

	Creator	Latest stable version	Release date	OS	Software license	Open source	Programming language	Plug-in support
9menu	Arnold Robbins	1.8	June 1, 2004	Linux	GPL	Yes	C	No
Avant Window Navigator	Neil J. Patel	0.4.2	November 27, 2013	Linux	GPL	Yes	C	Yes
dmenu	dwm developers	5.4	August 9, 2025	Linux	MIT	Yes	C	No
GNOME Do	GNOME Do Developers	0.95.1	January 23, 2014	Linux	GPL	Yes	C#	Yes
Katapult	TDE Developers	R14.0.6	March 5, 2019	Linux with TDE	GPL	Yes	C++	Yes
Unity Dash	Canonical Ltd.	7.3.0	June 19, 2014	Ubuntu	GPLv3	Yes	Vala	Yes (lenses and scopes)
Synapse	Michal Hruby and Alberto Aldegheri	0.2.99.4	April 8, 2018	Linux	GPLv3	Yes	Vala	Yes

== macOS ==
These desktop application launchers work with the Apple macOS operating system only.

	Creator	Latest stable version	Release date	Software license	Open source	Programming language	Plug-in support	Runs on macOS Catalina
Alfred	Running with Crayons	5.5	March 18, 2024	Proprietary	No	Objective-C	Yes	Yes
Butler	Peter Maurer	4.4.8	January 8, 2024	Proprietary	No	Objective-C	Yes	Yes
DragThing	James Thomson	5.9.17	November 16, 2016	Proprietary	No	C++	Yes	No
LaunchBar	Objective Development	6.19.1	July 5, 2024	Proprietary	No	Objective-C	Yes	Yes
Quicksilver	Quicksilver Foundation	2.6.0	April 19, 2026	Apache	Yes	Objective-C	Yes	Yes
Raycast	Raycast Technologies Ltd.	1.79.0	July 17, 2024	Proprietary	No	Swift	Yes	Yes

== Cross platform ==
These desktop application launchers work with two or more different operating systems.

	Creator	Latest stable version	Release date	OS	Software license	Open source	Programming language	Plug-in support	Runs on macOS Catalina
Launchy	Josh Karlin	2.5.0	April 4, 2010	Windows, Linux, macOS	GPL	Yes	C++ (Qt)	Yes	No

== See also ==
- List of dock applications
- Novell ZENworks, software formerly named (and still informally termed) "Novell Application Launcher"
