= Unsanity =

- Industry: Software development
- Founded: May 2000; 26 years ago

Unsanity was a macOS shareware software developer founded in May 2000, notable for coining the term "haxie". Unsanity produced Mac utilities that relied on their own Application Enhancer, a utility that modified the system and other applications. Software incompatibility with Mac OS X Leopard, Snow Leopard, and Lion ended Unsanity's offerings.

== History ==
Unsanity began developing audio player applications, Unsanity Echo and Mint Audio, before pivoting to Mac utility software. While Apple had offered an official extension system in MacOS 9, no similar add-on architecture existed upon the release of Mac OS X. Unsanity coined the term "haxie" (from "hack Mac OS X") to describe retrofits or tweaks made to the Mac OS X system. Unsanity's haxies included Mighty Mouse, which changed the system cursor, and FruitMenu, which adjusted the system menus. These haxies worked by using Unsanity's Application Enhancer (APE), which also allowed third-party developers to write Mac OS X haxies. By 2008, they made around a dozen utilities for the Mac.

Because the haxies injected code into unintended locations, they could cause unexpected software issues. Other third-party developers would blame haxies as the culprit if their own applications unexpectedly quit, and Apple went so far as to say it would ignore submitted crash logs submitted from a system with Application Enhancer installed. With the release of Mac OS X Leopard and Mac OS X Snow Leopard, many haxies stopped working partially or at all; users with old versions of Application Enhancer suffered system crashes on upgrading their systems to Leopard. Promised updates to offer Leopard compatibility failed to appear; after months of silence, Unsanity announced plans to port specific products to Snow Leopard, creating new versions of popular utilities that only worked under Snow Leopard by leveraging new OS technologies like Core Animation. Some software, such as Windowshade X, did have Snow Leopard versions released, but compatibility would be short-lived; Mac OS X Lion was entirely incompatible with Unsanity's Application Enhancer utilities. The company Twitter account stopped posting November 2011 and the company's website went dark soon after.

== Software ==
Unsanity-developed software included:

- Application Enhancer (APE) provides a framework that allows third-party developers to write haxies for Mac OS X.
- Dock Detox: eliminates the bouncing of icons in the Mac OS X Dock when the application requests attention
- FruitMenu: customization and enhancements for the Apple menu
- Labels X: adds color tints and labels for files in Mac OS X (Apple would reintroduce labels with Mac OS X Panther.)
- MightyMouse: allows customization and animation of the Mac OS X cursor
- ShapeShifter: allows the user to make system-wide modifications to the appearance of the operating system's graphical interface by applying GUI skins
- Silk: enables anti-aliased text in Mac OS X Carbon applications
- WindowShade X: replicates the WindowShade behavior of MacOS 9
- Xounds: brings Appearance Manager sounds to Mac OS X
