= Senuti =

- Developer: Whitney Young
- Stable release: 1.2.9 / April 19, 2006
- Operating system: macOS
- License: Shareware
- Website: fadingred.com/senuti/

Senuti (iTunes spelled backwards) is a Mac OS X computer application written by Whitney Young. It was released on April 19, 2006, for copying songs from an iPod to a Macintosh computer running Mac OS X 10.5 or later. According to FadingRed, the company that sold and distributed Senuti, it has been downloaded over 2 million times.

== Description ==
Senuti is an application for transferring files, such as songs and videos, from an iPod or iPhone back to a Macintosh computer. It is a Mac OS X-exclusive application; no version of Senuti has been released for Microsoft Windows. It can be downloaded from FadingRed's 'Adieu' page as a free demo, which allows the user to transfer 1,000 songs from an iPod. The unlimited version was available for around US$20, and can still be activated with an existing product key. No technical support is provided for Senuti as of January 19th, 2019.

== History ==
Senuti was developed by Whitney Young, who started as a high school senior searching for a way to transfer music from his iPod onto a Mac computer. Upon realizing that a good solution did not exist, Whitney wrote one. He leveraged the developers in the open-source community to help him write the code. Senuti is now sold by a software company called FadingRed, of which Young is co-founder and lead developer.

Senuti was originally released as GNU GPL software. The code following the 0.50.2 release was changed to payware in February 2009, although publications such as Wired still referred to the product as Open Source code as late as April 2009. The older, GPL version of this software is still available online.
