= Command palette =

Searchable index of software commands

Example of Command palette（Visual Studio Code）

A command palette is a searchable index of software commands, appearing as a modal palette window with a search box and suggestions list. It allows the user to recall and immediately invoke a command by name, using incremental search, fuzzy search, or a list of recently or frequently used commands.

A command palette may be opened with a keyboard shortcut such as Ctrl+⇧ Shift+P, and thus may be used entirely by keyboard. While the labels of commands may reinforce their own shortcuts or canonical menu locations, the command palette can also be used as an alternative to or replacement for those models. Palettes may include commands that are not exposed elsewhere in the graphical user interface. They may also be extensible.

Software applications with command palettes include Visual Studio Code, Zed and Obsidian. The command palette interface is also used in standalone pieces of utility software for operating systems, such as Raycast.

Ctrl+⇧ Shift+P in VS Code and Zed.

Ctrl+K in Discord.
