= Butler (software) =

Application launcher for macOS

- Developer(s): Peter Maurer
- Stable release: 4.4.8 / January 8th, 2024
- Operating system: macOS
- Type: Application launcher
- License: donationware
- Website: http://www.manytricks.com/butler/

Butler is an application launcher for macOS by Peter Maurer. It can learn common abbreviations for programs and which are used most frequently. Butler can play music on iTunes and copy and move files. It can be accessed via a menu or keyboard shortcut. Butler is similar to other launchers such as Quicksilver and LaunchBar.

== Awards ==
- Butler was named MacAddict's April 2006 Shareware pick of the month.
