= Google Pack =

Google software

Google Pack logo

Google Pack was a collection of software tools offered by Google to download in a single archive. It was announced at the 2006 Consumer Electronics Show, on January 6. Google Pack was only available for Windows XP, Windows Vista, and Windows 7.

In September 2011, Google announced it would discontinue a number of its products, including Google Pack. Google Pack is no longer available for download.

== Available applications before discontinued service ==
Users could choose which of the following software applications to install. If the application was already installed, Google Updater checked to see if the user had the latest version and upgraded it, if necessary.

The software applications that were available to download depended on the language, locale, and operating system.

=== Google-branded ===
- Google Desktop
- Picasa, a photograph organizer and editor
- Google Toolbar for Internet Explorer
- Google Photos Screensaver, which displays pictures from the user's computers and later, from many photo-sharing sites.
- Google Earth, an electronic globe
- Google Talk, an instant messaging and Voice over IP (VoIP) application
- Google Video Player, a multi-media player, now withdrawn
- Google Chrome, a free web browser developed by Google

=== Mac Software ===
- Google Quick Search Box
- Google Earth
- Picasa for Mac
- SketchUp
- Notifier for Mac
- Picasa Web Albums Uploader
- Toolbar for Firefox

=== Third-party ===
- Mozilla Firefox with Google Toolbar
- Spyware Doctor with Anti-Virus
- Adobe Reader, a document viewer
- RealPlayer, a multi-media player
- Skype, a VoIP application
- StarOffice, a productivity suite that includes a word processor, a spreadsheet and a presentation program.
- Immunet Protect Antivirus
- avast! Free Antivirus
- WebM for IE9

In March 2007, Google added two new applications to the Google Pack: Spyware Doctor Starter Edition and Norton Security Scan. These programs were free and did not require a subscription, unlike Norton AntiVirus. However, Norton Security Scan does not offer continuous protection against viruses. Norton Security Scan scans the computer and identifies if there are existing viruses, worms, spyware, unwanted adware or Trojans residing on it. The program's functionality is similar to Microsoft's Windows Malicious Software Removal Tool.

Google has stated they have no monetary agreement with the makers of the above software and they offered the applications for the ease of Google's customers. They didn't receive any payment for providing the software pack, although Miguel Helft in his New York Times blog reported that an unidentified source stated that Google may pay Sun for each copy of StarOffice. StarOffice was no longer part of Google Pack since November 2008.

Google has included the VoIP application Skype in the pack, even though it is a competitor of Google's own Google Talk.

Some industry observers claimed that the release was little more than a collection of software "that Google's wrapped a rubber band around".

=== Former third-party before discontinued service ===
- Ad-Aware
- GalleryPlayer
- Norton Antivirus Special Edition 2005, which included a 6-month subscription
- Norton Security Scan
- Trillian
- Spyware Doctor Starter Edition

== Google Updater ==
Google Pack came with Google Updater as a package management system to assist in downloading, installing, removing, and automatically updating the Pack's applications. Updater could be uninstalled without removing the applications.
