= WindowShade =

Classic Mac OS control panel extension

WindowShade was a control panel extension for the classic Mac OS that allowed a user to double-click a window's title bar to "roll up" the window like a windowshade. When the window was "rolled up", only the title bar of the window was visible; the window's content area disappeared, allowing easier manipulation of the windows on the screen.

== History ==
It debuted in System 7.5, but disappeared in Mac OS 8, when the feature was implemented as a part of the Appearance Manager. A widget was added to the title bar in addition to the double-click method of collapsing a window. The entire feature disappeared with the release of Mac OS X; windows could be minimized to the Dock on the new system or, starting with Mac OS X 10.3, moved aside with Exposé. However, several third-party utilities, such as WindowShade X for Unsanity's Application Enhancer software, have brought the ability back to Mac OS. It has since reappeared as a commercial haxie (an unofficial modification to system software) and offers other features, like translucent windows and minimize-in-place. WindowShade X from Unsanity stopped working in Mac OS 10.7, and other third-party developers have since released applications such as WindowMizer from RGB World that keep the WindowShade feature working on Mac OS X 10.6 and greater.

The WindowShade control panel itself stems from a third-party utility originally written for System 6.0.7 by Rob Johnston. Apple purchased the rights to this software from the developer for use in System 7.5.

== Other operating systems ==
Some window managers for Unix-like operating systems have a similar feature allowing windows to be set to "roll up" when the user double-clicks the title bar of a window. WinRoll is a third-party utility for Microsoft Windows that accomplishes this via a right click of the title bar. Some window managers provide a titlebar button to access the functionality. While Windows does not expose such a feature by default, in some versions if a window is minimized while no taskbar is available, the said window will become a "shade" at the bottom of the screen. An intentional shading implementation for Windows is provided by third-party software vendors.
