= Katapult =

Application launcher for Linux

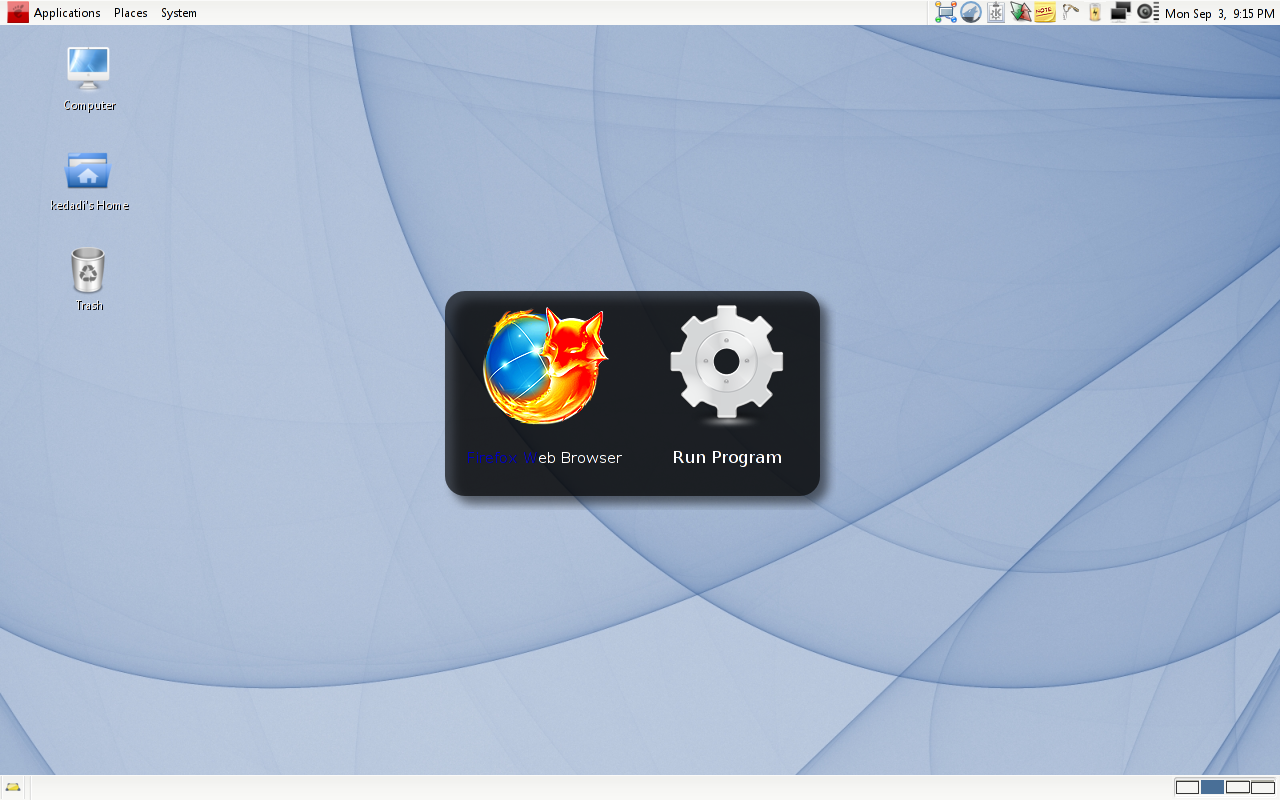
- Katapult in use
- Original author: KDE Developers
- Developer: TDE Developers
- Stable release: R14.1.1 / October 20, 2023; 2 years ago
- Repository: mirror.git.trinitydesktop.org/cgit/katapult/
- Written in: C++
- Operating system: Linux
- Type: Application Launcher
- License: GPL
- Website: web.archive.org/web/20090214151146/http://katapult.kde.org/wiki/KatapultHandbook

Katapult is a free and open source application launcher developed originally for KDE 3 and now used on the Trinity Desktop Environment (TDE). It is licensed under the GPL. It was inspired by another application launcher, Quicksilver for Mac OS X. Original development ceased in 2008 and it was removed in KDE 4, but it has been maintained by the TDE developers ever since.

Some of the functionality of Katapult has been integrated into the built-in KRunner program that ships with KDE Software Compilation 4.

== Features ==
Katapult allows the user to quickly launch applications and open files by pressing the Alt + Space keys and then typing the beginning of the file or application name. Users do not have to type out the entire name, only the first parts of it. It could started by pressing Alt + F2 or finding it in the application menu. It can only find programs in the K Menu and it can only find files in the top level home directory. Configuration settings can be accessed by pressing Ctrl + C after opening the program.

Katapult has integration with other KDE applications. It will open up songs searched through it in the Amarok music player. The program allows for bookmark importing from Konqueror or Mozilla-based browsers such as Firefox. The user could then search for bookmarks through Katapult and it would open them in Konqueror.

Katapult also features a calculator, a spell checker, plug-in support, and the ability to use different themes.

== See also ==
- Comparison of applications launchers
- KDE Plasma Workspaces
- Quicksilver (software)
