= SliderDock =

Application Launcher for Microsoft Windows

- Developer: Dimitri Roozendaal
- Operating system: Microsoft Windows (XP, Vista, Windows 7 (32-bit and 64-bit); requires .NET Framework 3.5 to run.
- Type: Dock
- License: Creative Commons
- Website: http://sliderdock.wikidot.com/

SliderDock is a freeware application launcher for Microsoft Windows that uses a wheel-like interface to organize icons. When the user scrolls with the mouse wheel, the icons rotate towards a fixed point so the user can access a specific icon. The SliderDock application can be minimized to a background process, which it utilizes to reduce RAM cost. Like many other docks, it can be customized with skins and icons from other docks.
