= KXDocker =

KXDocker is a discontinued and obsolete program for the Linux operating system written by Stefano Zingarini. It resembles the "Dock" of Mac OS X in that it is mainly used as an application launcher. It supports themes, plugins and a few extra features (there is documentation on creating your own themes). Other such docks available for Linux and KDE include Kiba-dock (implements physics simulation allowing the application icons to be dragged around and initially looked to be more suitable for the GNOME desktop environment), Kooldock and Ksmoothdock.

KXDocker was made for Linux distributions using KDE, but also works with GNOME. It is free software released under the terms of the GNU General Public License.

KXDocker was discontinued, and Zingarini stated that he started project XQDE. As of 2024 the XQDE homepage states "xqde.xiaprojects.com is almost here!", and the only code on SourceForge is dated 2009.
