= Raycast (software) =

Application launcher and productivity application for macOS

- App icon
- Developer: Raycast Technologies Ltd
- Release: 2020
- Stable release: v1.104 / 16 December 2025; 6 months ago
- Operating system: macOS, Windows 10, Windows 11
- Type: Application launcher (utility software)
- License: Proprietary
- Website: raycast.com

Raycast is an application launcher and productivity software developed for macOS and Windows by Raycast Technologies Ltd. It offers fast access to applications, dictionaries, files, text snippets, clipboard, and more. Raycast is an alternative to the macOS's built-in Spotlight function, with a richer interface and the option to install extensions, providing additional ways to display varied content.

As of 20th November 2025, Raycast entered the Public Beta phase for the Windows port.

== Features ==
=== Interface ===
Activated with a keyboard shortcut (⌥ Option+Space by default but can be changed), Raycast displays a window at the center of the screen, awaiting the user's input and displaying a list of suggested apps.

Raycast uses incremental search as the user types to predict the action the user intends to perform and display the corresponding result. The application outputs the data in different formats such as lists and grids with a single or two-pane layout, supporting various data types like text with Markdown, media, and additional input fields. Each result might have more than one action available.

=== Built-in functions ===
Raycast comes with many built-in features that can have a shortcut or an alias assigned, most notably:

- Application search
- File search
- Clipboard history
- Floating notes
- Calculator
- Changing volume, brightness, hibernating
- Word definitions
- Window management
- Snippets and text expansion
- Access to calendar events
- Quick access to ChatGPT (paid feature)

=== Extensibility ===
While Raycast itself is a closed-source application, it includes a built-in store that offers open-source extensions to extend its functionality. The API is open for developers and simple scripts could be written without extensive programming knowledge.

Some noteworthy extensions include managing GitHub repositories, controlling Spotify, language translation through Google Translate, accessing browser bookmarks, connecting to Jira, and more.

== See also ==
- Comparison of application launchers
