= GNOME Do =

Application launcher for Linux

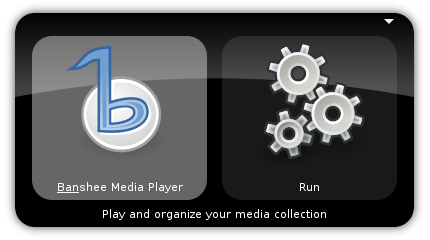
- GNOME Do in action (Classic interface shown)
- Original author: David Siegel
- Stable release: 0.95.3 (November 12, 2014; 11 years ago) [±]
- Repository: code.launchpad.net/do
- Written in: C#
- Operating system: Linux
- Platform: GNOME, Mono
- Type: Application launcher; Linux on the desktop
- License: GNU GPL
- Website: do.cooperteam.net

GNOME Do (often referred to as Do) is a free and open-source application launcher for Linux originally created by David Siegel, and currently maintained by Alex Launi. Like other application launchers, it allows searching for applications and files, but it also allows specifying actions to perform on search results. GNOME Do allows for quick finding of miscellaneous artifacts of GNOME environment (applications, Evolution and Pidgin contacts, Firefox bookmarks, Rhythmbox artists and albums, and so on) and execute the basic actions on them (launch, open, email, chat, play, etc.).

While it is designed primarily for the GNOME desktop, it works in other desktop environments, such as KDE.

GNOME Do was inspired by Quicksilver for Mac OS X, and GNOME Launch Box.

== Docky ==
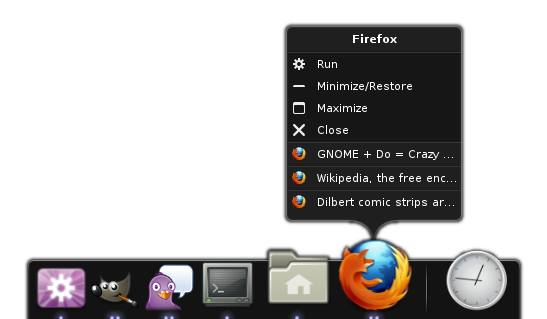
GNOME Do with the Docky interface

Docky is a theme for GNOME Do that behaves much like the Mac OS X dock. Unlike GNOME Do's traditional interface, Docky can be set to one of three modes for hiding:

- None - Docky is always visible.
- Autohide - Docky is normally hidden, and appears when the mouse pointer reaches Docky's (unseen) edge at the lower/upper edge of the screen.
- Intellihide - Docky hides if it overlaps any window in the active window group, but it can still be brought up with the mouse pointer as described above.

Standard Do functionality is still present within Docky, and the Do hot-key will still produce the expected behavior.

Docky 2 is a separate application from GNOME Do. Integration with GNOME Do is planned for Docky 2.

== See also ==
- Comparison of applications launchers
- List of dock applications
- GNOME
- Mono
