= Growl (software) =

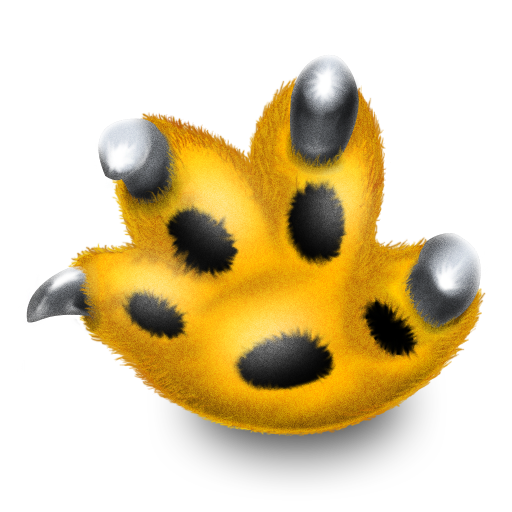

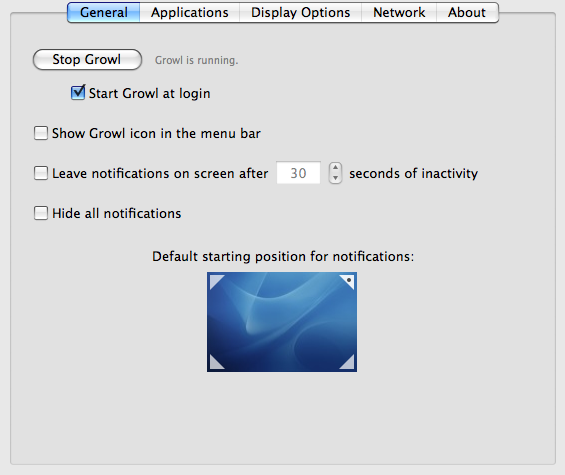
- Screenshot Growl Pref Pane screenshot Growl's "General" preferences in System Preferences running on Mac OS X Leopard.
- Developer: The Growl team led by Christopher Forsythe
- Release: 2004
- Stable release: 2.1.3 / 29 October 2013; 13 years ago
- Written in: Objective-C
- Operating system: Mac OS X, Windows XP or later
- Platform: Macintosh, Windows
- Type: Notification system
- License: Proprietary commercial software
- Website: growl.info

Growl is a deprecated global notification system and pop-up notification implementation for the Mac OS X and Windows operating systems. Applications can use Growl to display small notifications about events which may be important to the user. This software allows users to fully control their notifications, while allowing application developers to spend less time creating notifications and Growl developers to concentrate on the usability of notifications. Growl can be used in conjunction with Apple's Notification Center that is included in Mac OS X 10.8 (Mountain Lion) and higher.

== Details ==
Growl is installed as a preference pane added to the Mac OS X System Preferences. This pane may be used to enable and disable Growl's notifications for specific applications or specific notifications for each application. Each notification provides some information, such as "Download Finished" or the name of the current iTunes track. The software comes with multiple display plugins, providing the user with different style options for presenting the notifications. Display plugins include visual styles as well as the ability to send notifications via email, SMS, or push notifications. Additional third-party plugins or scripts exist to add Growl notifications to iChat, Mail, Thunderbird, Safari, and iTunes.

Application developers may make use of the Growl API to send notifications to their users. Growl includes bindings for developers who use the Objective-C, C, Perl, Python, Tcl, AppleScript, Java, and Ruby programming languages.

== Adobe installation ==
The Growl website listed applications that install Growl without the user's permission, including Adobe Creative Suite 5. Adobe published a blog post apologizing for installing Growl on users' systems without permission, and says that they are "actively working to mitigate the problem". Adobe added an article to their knowledge base explaining what notifications CS5 sends and how to remove Growl.

== See also ==
- Apple Notification Center
- Snarl (software)
