= Synapse (journal) =

- Discipline: Neuroscience
- Language: English
- Edited by: Benjamin J. Hall

Publication details
- History: 1999-present
- Publisher: Wiley-Liss
- Frequency: 16/year
- Impact factor: 2.562 (2020)

Standard abbreviations
- ISO 4: Synapse

Indexing
- CODEN: SYNAET
- ISSN: 0887-4476 (print); 1098-2396 (web)
- OCLC no.: 13234053

Links
- Journal homepage; Online archive

Synapse is a peer-reviewed scientific journal of neuroscience published in New York City by Wiley-Liss to address basic science topics on synaptic function, structure and connectivity. The editor-in-chief is Benjamin J. Hall (H. Lundbeck A/S). According to the Journal Citation Reports, the journal has a 2020 impact factor of 2.562, ranking it 201st out of 273 journals in the category "Neurosciences".
