= Mac Box Set =

The Mac Box Set was a software package made by Apple Inc., including the latest version of macOS (then Mac OS X), iWork, and iLife.

The Mac Box Set was updated twice after its original release. The first release was introduced and shipped on the same date iLife and iWork '09 were, January 9, 2009. It included the retail discs for Mac OS X 10.5.6 Leopard, iLife '09, and iWork '09.

This was commonly called "Mac Box Set '09". The next release started shipping shortly after Mac OS X Snow Leopard was introduced. The only thing that changed in this release was that the Mac OS X version was 10.6.3 Snow Leopard. This shipped until after iLife '11 was introduced, where the iLife version was updated. Everything else stayed the same.

The Mac Box Set retailed for US$169 for a single-user license and US$229 for the “family pack.”

== Editions ==
These were the only three versions of the Mac Box Set:

- Version 1: Mac OS X 10.5.6 Leopard, iLife '09, and iWork '09
- Version 2: Mac OS X 10.6.3 Snow Leopard, iLife '09, and iWork '09
- Version 3: Mac OS X 10.6.3 Snow Leopard, iLife '11, and iWork '09
