= UpdateStar =

Package-management software

- Developer: UpdateStar
- Release: 2007; 19 years ago
- Stable release: 15.0.1962 / April 15, 2024; 2 years ago
- Written in: C++
- Operating system: Microsoft Windows
- Available in: English, German, French, Italian, Romanian, Spanish and others
- Type: Package management system
- License: Proprietary software
- Website: www.updatestar.com

UpdateStar is a freeware software application providing update information for approximately 1.3 million software programs. Implementing a social computing aspect, the update database is maintained by the users. UpdateStar uses advertising to refinance the free service and shares ad revenue 50/50 with the software authors via their Share program.

Software can be searched, downloaded and updated. In addition, UpdateStar is a freeware client that can be easily installed to inform users about available updates for their individual software setup. It allows downloading, installing and uninstalling the programs from within the client, which acts as an enhancement for the Add/Remove Programs control panel applet (Programs and Features on Windows Vista and above).

The software search engine at http://www.updatestar.com/ is built on top of UpdateStar’s user generated software and program database. Via the ad revenue sharing program Share, UpdateStar allows developers to use the UpdateStar website as a download mirror to participate from ad revenue created on their program’s webpages.

UpdateStar has been reviewed by Computerworld, Softpedia, PC Advisor, and c't among others.

== History ==
UpdateStar was founded by Michael Ganss, Frank Alperstaedt, and Olaf Kehrer in 2007, and is based in Berlin. The software search engine website itself, however, did not launch until July 2008. The company is funded by the founders.

The current version of the site was released in July 2008. This included new software search capabilities with results based on user submitted information for more than 259,000 programs, a new professional services business section, and an UpdateStar freeware client section.

UpdateStar freeware has grown in popularity with about 50,000 users in 2007 and about 550,000 users in July 2008.

UpdateStar 4, released in March 2009 introduced an enhanced recognition algorithm and a registry cleaner, which removes remnants of uninstalled software. Updates appear almost on a daily basis for a software setup with 60 to 80 programs on a typical PC making it nearly impossible for a PC user to keep up. The program is available as freeware as well as the commercial Premium Edition with additional security advice for program, a cleaner for system maintenance and more.

UpdateStar provides the user with information about software updates available for software on their computer. This includes major releases provided by UpdateStar Freeware Edition as well as minor version upgrades and patches included with the Premium Edition. Many updates are published because of security reasons and newly included features. Either way software updates should be considered important or even critical in case of updates made available by the publishers for security reasons. UpdateStar Premium additionally offers security advice allowing for an identification of important software updates.

UpdateStar Premium includes a tool to clean the Windows Registry from superfluous and faulty software entries which are often the result of incompletely uninstalled software.

Two million users profit from the UpdateStar service per month (December 2009) and receive updates for their PCs software. UpdateStar provides users with program update information for 4.5 million installations - daily.

UpdateStar released version 5 on Oct 19, 2009 introducing improved version recognition, improved Windows 7 support, new language support for Korean and Lithuanian, and improved translations of Russian, Hungarian, and Romanian.

Software on the website is regularly scanned by a range of antivirus scanners using VirusTotal and shows detailed virus scanning reports for each software product.

== Revenue model ==
UpdateStar uses the software search engine website to share ad revenue with software authors. Other professional services include software market research (Analytics) as well as targeted marketing services (Connect) to software vendors. This allows UpdateStar to provide their update information service for free to their user community.

=== Share - the ad sharing program ===
The UpdateStar website tracks created ad revenues on program pages. The Share program creates PPC based revenue streams. When users click on ads on a program’s download page in the UpdateStar web, the advertiser is charged and the advertising fee is split between UpdateStar and the software vendor, if the vendor participates as a Share partner. UpdateStar website’s user traffic comes from targeted alerts about newly available updates for used software and offering information and downloads. Traffic multiplies with the number of updates and users. This way Share software vendor partners participate repeatedly from revenue created with their content (their software) as long as they participate.

== Online Backup ==
In February 2010, UpdateStar began a commercial online backup service called UpdateStar Online Backup. Users of UpdateStar Online Backup can select files and folders through a desktop application, which are then periodically backed up to a remote data center. The program employs a differential backup algorithm to minimize the amount of data that needs to be backed up on subsequent runs.

UpdateStar offers plans with unlimited storage for home and business desktop computers and limited storage (100 GB, 250 GB, 500 GB) for server computers. The program runs on Windows XP, Windows Vista, Windows 7 (desktop edition), and Windows Server 2003 and Windows Server 2008 (server edition).

UpdateStar Online Backup was retired in 2023 and is no longer available.

== See also ==
- User-generated content
- Package manager
