= Quicksilver (software) =

Utility application for macOS

- Developer: Quicksilver Foundation
- Stable release: 2.6.0 / April 19, 2026
- Operating system: macOS
- Type: Application Launcher (utility software)
- License: Apache License
- Website: qsapp.com
- Repository: github.com/quicksilver/Quicksilver

Quicksilver is a utility app for macOS. Originally developed as proprietary freeware by Nicholas Jitkoff of Blacktree, Inc., it is now an open-source project hosted on GitHub.

Quicksilver is essentially a graphical shell for the macOS operating system, allowing users to use the keyboard to rapidly perform tasks such as launching other apps, manipulating files, or sending e-mail. Since its first release in 2003, many of its features have subsequently been integrated into the modern macOS system feature, Spotlight. It is similar to the macOS applications LaunchBar and Alfred, but uses a different interaction paradigm. Because of its flexible interface and extensibility, Quicksilver has been called one of the top productivity applications on the Mac.

== Features ==
=== Interface ===
Invoked with a keyboard shortcut, Quicksilver has three panes, into which the user can enter an object, an action, and an optional attribute—analogous to creating a sentence with a subject, verb, and object.

Quicksilver is a background application that runs while the operating system is running, maintaining a "catalog" of files and objects on the user's computer. By applying incremental search as the user types, Quicksilver predicts the filename or action typed by the user and automatically selects the object. Quicksilver uses a priority system based on prior usage to "learn" the user's habits, ultimately requiring only a few letters for the most commonly selected objects.

=== Extensibility ===
==== Triggers ====
Quicksilver allows users to define "triggers," which perform a specific command (direct object/action/indirect object combination) whenever a customizable keyboard shortcut is pressed. For instance, if a command opening the Documents folder is bound to the F7 key, this hotkey would trigger that action regardless of what application the user is currently in.

==== Plug-ins ====
Quicksilver has a built-in plug-in architecture, allowing the user to choose and install plug-ins providing integration with a specific program, interface, or new feature. For example, plug-ins exist for sending email via Mail without opening the application or manipulating images via text commands.

==== Flexibility ====
Because shell scripts and AppleScripts can be stored in the catalog, any function which can be performed with a script can be tied to Quicksilver through either the command window or triggers. Because most Apple-native applications have extensive scripting libraries, many common tasks can easily be performed from Quicksilver. For instance, iTunes can be told to play or pause, increase or decrease the current track's rating, or skip to the previous or next track.

There are various visual interfaces for Quicksilver, Constellation Menus supporting mouse gestures, and a Notification Hub which supports Growl.

=== Alchemy ===
Experimental trunk builds of Quicksilver, known as Alchemy, have many major changes.

- Triggers are moving to a separate product, called Catalyst
- All the little frameworks are being joined into one big one called Crucible. This includes extensions and core functionality that most applications and plugins will use. This is currently called QSBase.framework
- The preferences will be greatly simplified. There will be Extras-style advanced preferences for the fiddly options.
- Plugins are going to be hidden from most users, they'll activate themselves automatically or be installable from the web
- β5X Plugins are incompatible.

These builds have four major components: Crucible, a framework with extension to AppKit and tools common to all Alchemy applications; elements, a framework supporting the plugin architecture; quicksilver, a command window driven launcher; and catalyst, which triggers a preference pane.

== History ==
Nicholas Jitkoff started development of Quicksilver in 2003. He released several versions to the public until 2006 and maintained an internet forum for the tool from the beginning.

On October 30, 2007, the source code for Quicksilver was made available via Google Code. In November 2009, development shifted to using GitHub. Quicksilver is now developed by a team of volunteers known collectively as QSApp.

At the end of 2010, the new website QSApp.com was launched, with the aim of unifying and collating all of Quicksilver's fragmented builds, plugins and support groups. Since its launch, the site has included a new Plugins Repository, Wiki and Downloads section. After several months of development, the milestone version β59 was released. On March 25, 2013, Quicksilver v1.0 was released after ten years of beta testing. On March 25, 2022, Quicksilver v2.0 was released, which runs natively on Apple Silicon (M1) Macs.

Quicksilver's icon is based on the alchemical symbol for mercury, "quicksilver" being an archaic name for the element.

== See also ==
- Comparison of application launchers
- LaunchBar
- Alfred (software)
- Butler (software)
- Katapult
- Command line interface
