= ObjectDock =

- Items on the dock can be set to 'zoom' when the mouse passes over them
- Developer: Stardock
- Stable release: 3.0 / March 20, 2024
- Operating system: Microsoft Windows
- Type: Dock
- Website: www.stardock.com/products/ObjectDock

ObjectDock is a dock similar to that in the Aqua GUI. It is distributed by Stardock for Windows 7, Windows 8, Windows 8.1, and Windows 10 and comes in Free and Plus versions.

== Features ==
ObjectDock allows the user to place shortcuts to any program in a "dock." This provides Windows users functionality similar to that of Mac OS X. The program comes in two versions, free, and a paid version offering more features. The free version is no longer available from the official site, but is still available from the CNET CDN that the homepage used to redirect to.

ObjectDock can be used as a program launcher, or as a complete taskbar replacement. Its functionality can be enhanced with plugins to provide features such as weather forecasts or news.

== Versions ==
Version 2.0 added preliminary Vista support, resource-searching, improved drag-and-drop, and new zoom effects. The current version is 2.2 which added tabbed docks.
