= UltraMon =

- Developer: Realtime Soft
- Stable release: 3.4.1 / October 4, 2018; 8 years ago
- Operating system: Microsoft Windows
- Type: Multi monitor
- License: Proprietary EULA
- Website: http://www.realtimesoft.com/ultramon/

UltraMon is a commercial application for Microsoft Windows users who use multiple displays. UltraMon is developed by Realtime Soft, a small software development company based in Bern, Switzerland.

UltraMon currently contains the following features:

- Two additional title bar buttons for managing windows among the monitors
- Customizable button location
- A taskbar on each additional monitor that displays tasks on that monitor
- Pre-defined application window placement
- Display profiles for multiple pre-defined display settings
- Spannable wallpaper option
- Different wallpapers for different monitors
- Advanced multiple-monitor screensaver management
- Display mirroring (Forces to software rendering)
- Overcome Windows' limit of 10 displays

UltraMon is distributed as trialware, requiring the user to purchase the software after a trial period (30 days).

UltraMon 3.3.0 is available with full Windows XP, Vista, 7, and 8 support.

== See also ==
- Multi-monitor
