= Synapse (software) =

Application launcher for Linux

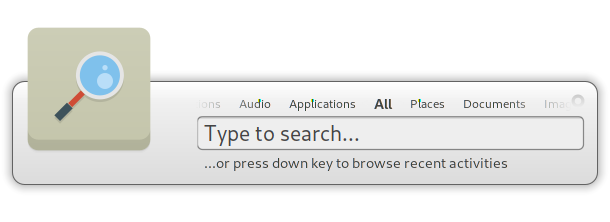
- Synapse in action (Default interface shown)
- Original author: Synapse core team
- Initial release: 30 November 2010; 15 years ago
- Stable release: 0.2.99.4 / 8 April 2018; 7 years ago
- Written in: Vala
- Operating system: Unix-like
- Platform: Any window manager
- Type: Application launcher; Linux on the desktop
- License: GNU GPL, GNU LGPL
- Website: launchpad.net/synapse-project

Synapse is a free and open-source application launcher for Linux originally created by Michal Hruby and Alberto Aldegheri.

== See also ==
- Comparison of applications launchers
