= Winaero =

Software used to tweak Microsoft Windows

- Company type: Private
- Website type: Reviews / Software Development, software site / blog
- Founded: July 2011
- Headquarters: Penza, {{{location_country}}}
- Founder: Sergey Tkachenko
- Key people: Sergey Tkachenko, Development Lead
- Employees: 1
- Website: www.winaero.com

Winaero
- Stable release: v1.63 / July 4, 2024; 2 years ago
- Size: 5,848 kB
- Website: www.winaero.com

Winaero is a website hosting freeware tweaking tools for Microsoft Windows. It is made by a Russian software developer, Sergey Tkachenko. The website offers freeware tools for modifying the behavior of Microsoft Windows. Amongst these are Skip Metro Suite, which allows for skipping the Windows 8 Start screen, booting straight to the Windows desktop and customizing the Modern UI hot corners. Other tools include Ribbon Disabler, which allows disabling the Explorer Ribbon interface and Personalization Panel which replicates the full personalization restricted by low end editions of Windows.

== History ==
Winaero started in July 2011 as a simple English download page for the former Russian original project by Sergey Tkachenko. Winreview later ceased to operate and Winaero became the sole focus of the developer. From August 2012 Winaero started to publish English articles on its blog.

== Recognition ==
Winaero's software utilities have been recognized by several news sites and blogs, such as Lifehacker, PCWorld, Engadget. A number of Winaero tools have been featured on these sites.
