= DragThing =

- DragThing dock window.
- Developer: James Thomson
- Stable release: 5.9.17 / 16 November 2016
- Operating system: macOS
- Type: Utility
- License: Shareware
- Website: www.dragthing.com

DragThing was a shareware Dock application for Mac OS X. Intended for organization and as an application switcher, DragThing allowed for multiple docks with user-specified settings such as color, texture and shape. Dock contents could be organized into tabs and paying the shareware fee enabled the user to assign a keyboard shortcut to any dock item.

DragThing won many awards, and in 2010 MacWorld gave it 4.5 mice, highlighting its utility for users who preferred using the mouse over keyboard-oriented launchers such as LaunchBar or QuickSilver.

== History ==
In its early versions, DragThing brought many features useful in a multitasking environment to Classic Mac OS such as alt-tab application switching and an onscreen representation of running processes. These features were not implemented by Apple until Mac OS 8.5.

DragThing was one of the first applications to adopt the Platinum appearance on Mac OS 8 and ran in the Blue Box on Apple's aborted Rhapsody project.

The DragThing release schedule slowed between 1998 and 2000, as its developer James Thomson was then employed at Apple Inc. as part of the team working on Mac OS X's Finder and Dock. He surmised that the built-in Dock of OS X would soon make DragThing obsolete. Thomson left Apple shortly after Mac OS X was released as he did not want to relocate from Ireland to Cupertino and resumed work on DragThing, releasing version 4.0 on 24 March 2001, skipping version 3. None of Thomson's code survives in the current shipping version of Apple's Dock.

DragThing was first released on 1 May 1995 and celebrated its 10th anniversary in 2005. It was praised in a 2004 article by Bruce Tognazzini, who said "...if I could have taken all the lessons learned in Systems 1 through 9 and applied them to System X, I certainly wouldn't have ended up with the Dock. No, I would have ended up with DragThing..."

In late 2018, the software developer warned of probable end-of-life. This decision was confirmed in 2019, with its website updated to say:

DragThing is written using the 32-bit Carbon APIs that Apple have now removed in macOS 10.15 Catalina. It will no longer run if you update to Catalina, and there are no plans to make a new version that will. We are sorry to say, DragThing has launched its last app. 64-bit support would require completely rewriting the code from the ground up, a process which would take us at least a year to complete... Unfortunately, there is not enough of a market out there these days, such that it would be financially viable for us to do so.
