= Alfred (software) =

Application launcher and productivity application for macOS

- Original authors: Andrew Pepperrell, Vero Pepperrell
- Developer: Running with Crayons Ltd
- Release: 2010
- Stable release: v5.7.2 / 9 December 2025; 11 months ago
- Operating system: macOS
- Type: Application launcher (utility software)
- License: Proprietary
- Website: www.alfredapp.com

Alfred is an application launcher and productivity software for macOS developed by Running with Crayons Ltd. It provides faster access to applications, files, folders, dictionaries, and various system functions. Alfred is similar to macOS's Spotlight function, but offers a higher degree of customizability and extensibility through its action system known as "workflows".

== Features ==
Alfred comes with the following features:

- Application launcher that uses repeated queries to prioritize search results
- File and folder search
- Web search shortcuts with predefined sites such as Amazon, IMDb, DuckDuckGo, Wolfram Alpha, Wikipedia, and many others as well as ability to create custom shortcuts
- Safari and Google Chrome bookmark search
- Clipboard history (Note: Accessible only within paid version of Alfred.)
- Text expansion and snippets
- Calculator
- Dictionary
- Contact search
- Music control
- 1Password integration
- Control of various system functions such as shutting down, hibernation, quitting, and force quitting processes, etc.
- Quick access to various operations on selected text and files, including text manipulation, text translation, and more
- Running shell commands

=== Personalization ===
Alfred's functionality can be extended through "workflows", which are constructed through a visual scripting system based on nodes. Creating workflows does not require programming knowledge, although it does support the execution of scripts written in AppleScript, Bash, Python, and others.

Many of Alfred's features and workflows can be accessed by defining a global keyboard shortcut or a keyword before the query.

Alfred's visual appearance is customizable through themes. It comes with a collection of presets that can be used for free, while creating and importing themes requires paid version.

=== Alfred Remote ===
Alfred Remote is a mobile companion application available for iOS. It lets users control various functions on a macOS device where the paid version of Alfred is installed. These functions include adjusting volume, controlling Music, launching applications, and executing workflows.

== See also ==
- Comparison of application launchers
