= Avant Window Navigator =

User interface dock for Linux

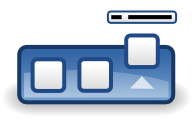

- A Screenshot of a development version of AWN
- Original author: Neil J. Patel
- Developer: Awn-core Team
- Stable release: 0.4.2 / November 27, 2013; 12 years ago
- Written in: C, Python, Vala
- Platform: Unix-like
- Available in: English
- Type: Application dock; Linux on the desktop
- License: GPL v2 (dock); LGPL v2.1 (library); CC BY-SA 3.0 (unported) (images)
- Website: https://github.com/p12tic/awn
- Repository: github.com/p12tic/awn

Avant Window Navigator (abbreviated AWN or Awn) is a dock-like bar for Linux, which sits on an edge of a user's screen and tracks open windows. Instead of representing open windows as buttons or segments on a bar, it uses large icons on a translucent background to increase readability and add visual appeal. The program was created by Neil J. Patel.

Both the appearance and functionality of Avant Window Navigator may be customized, and plugins and applets are available, such as to display the progress of a download in Mozilla Firefox or to control a music player like Rhythmbox. The plugins use the D-Bus IPC system, and applets can be written in C, Python or Vala. A sister project, AWN Extras, is a collection of community-contributed applets and plugins. Releases are usually kept in sync with AWN.

One of the major requirements to run older versions of Avant Window Navigator is a compositing window manager. At least version 0.4.0-2 in the Debian repos has either Metacity, xcompmgr, Compiz, xfwm4, KWin or Mutter as a dependency.

Therefore, the user was required to install a compositor, which could tax performance on low-end systems. Some alternatives were to use a lightweight desktop environment such as Xfce, which has a compositing manager since version 4.2.0, or to enable compositing in Metacity when using GNOME. However, support for non-composited environments is available in version 0.4.0.

== See also ==
- Dock (computing)
- Docky
- Kicker (KDE)
- GNOME Panel
