= Taskbar =

GUI desktop bar used to manage applications

The taskbar is a graphical user interface element that has been part of Microsoft Windows since Windows 95, displaying and facilitating switching between running programs. The taskbar and the associated Start Menu were created and named in 1993 by Daniel Oran, a program manager at Microsoft who had previously collaborated on great ape language research with the behavioral psychologist B.F. Skinner at Harvard.

The taskbar is an exemplar of a category of always-visible graphical user interface elements that provide access to fundamental operating system functions and information. At the time of its introduction in 1995, the taskbar was unique among such elements because it provided the user with a means of switching between running programs through a single click of the pointing device.

Since the introduction of Windows 95, other operating systems have incorporated graphical user interface elements that closely resemble the taskbar or have similar features. The designs vary, but generally include a strip along one edge of the screen. Icons or textual descriptions on this strip correspond to open windows. Clicking the icons or text enables the user to easily switch between windows, with the active window often appearing differently from the others on the strip. In some versions of recent operating systems, users can "pin" programs or files to this strip for quick access. In many cases, there is also a notification area, which includes interactive icons that display real-time information about the computer system and some of the running programs.

With the rapid evolution of operating systems and graphical user interfaces, items that are native to each operating system have been included in the various designs.

== Antecedents ==
=== Windows 1.0 ===
Windows 1.0, released in 1985, features a horizontal bar located at the bottom of the screen where running programs reside when minimized (referred to as "iconization" at the time), represented by icons. A window can be minimized by double-clicking its title bar, dragging it onto an empty spot on the bar, or by issuing a command from one of its menus. A minimized window is restored by double-clicking its icon or dragging the icon out of the bar.

The bar features multiple slots for icons and expands vertically to provide the user with more rows as more slots are needed. Its color is the same as that of the screen background, which can be customized. Minimized windows can be freely placed in any of the empty slots. Program windows cannot overlap the bar unless maximized.

The Start button did not make an appearance in these early implementations of the taskbar, and would be introduced at a much later date with the release of Windows 95.

Appearance of the bar used for holding minimized windows in Windows 1.0

=== Arthur ===
Another early implementation can be seen in the Arthur operating system from Acorn Computers. It is called the icon bar and remains an essential part of Arthur's succeeding RISC OS operating system. The icon bar holds icons which represent mounted disc drives and RAM discs, running applications and system utilities. These icons have their own context-sensitive menus and support drag and drop behaviour.

Appearance of Acorn's icon bar in 1987 under Arthur, after launching a number of devices and applications

=== Amiga ===
AmigaOS featured various third party implementations of the taskbar concept, and this inheritance is present also in its successors. For example, AmiDock, born as third-party utility, has then been integrated into AmigaOS 3.9 and AmigaOS 4.0. The AROS operating system has its version of Amistart that is provided with the OS and free to be installed by users, while MorphOS has been equipped with a dock utility just like in AmigaOS or Mac OS X.

== Microsoft Windows ==
The default settings for the taskbar in Microsoft Windows place it at the bottom of the screen and includes from left to right the Start menu button, Quick Launch bar, taskbar buttons, and notification area. The Quick Launch toolbar was added with the Windows Desktop Update and is not enabled by default in Windows XP. Windows 7 removed the Quick Launch feature in favor of pinning applications to the taskbar itself. In Windows 8 and Windows Server 2012, a hotspot located in the bottom-left corner of the screen replaced the Start button, although this change was reverted in Windows 8.1 and Windows Server 2012 R2.

The Windows 95 taskbar buttons evolved from an earlier task-switching design by Daniel Oran, a program manager at Microsoft, that featured file-folder-like tabs across the top of the screen, similar to those that later appeared in web browsers. For this reason, the taskbar was originally intended to be at the top of the screen. But the final configuration of Windows 95 put the taskbar at the bottom of the screen, replacing a user interface element called the tray that had been borrowed from Microsoft's Cairo project. Windows 95 OSR 2.5 would add the Quick Launch toolbar.

The first implementation of the Windows taskbar in Windows 95. It also appeared in Windows NT 4.0, Windows 98, Windows Me and Windows 2000.

With the release of Windows XP, Microsoft changed the behavior of the taskbar to take advantage of Fitts's law by removing a border of pixels surrounding the Start button which did not activate the menu, allowing the menu to be activated by clicking directly in the corner of the screen. Icons in the notification area could now be hidden to save space and revealed with the arrow button.

A standard Windows XP taskbar with multiple tasks running

For Windows Vista, the taskbar remained functionally the same but received a visual overhaul to align the new Windows Aero design language, introducing transparency effects to the taskbar, and a Start orb without "start" text that now slightly overlapped the content displayed above the taskbar.

The taskbar in Windows Vista

With Windows 7 saw the first major redesign of the taskbar since its introduction with larger app icons, the ability to pin apps to the taskbar so that they are shown even if they are not active, and hiding app names by default. Quick Launch was also disabled by default. Users still had the option to show the app names again and reduce the taskbar height to create a taskbar similar to the design used in Windows Vista. At the right side of the taskbar, the Aero Peak button was added, allowing users to quickly view the contents of the desktop and their widgets by hovering over the button, or minimize all apps by clicking on it.

The taskbar in Windows 7

Windows 8 introduced no functional changes to the taskbar, but replaced the Start button and Aero Peek button with hot corners for desktop users. Tablet users could now use the Charms bar. Windows 8.1 restored the Start button, and with Windows 8.1 Update, it was now possible to see Metro apps on the taskbar and pin them, as well as to access the taskbar while on the Start screen.

The taskbar in Windows 8 on the desktop
The taskbar in Windows 8.1 Update

Windows 10, version 1507 added various major changes to the taskbar. A search bar was now shown by default that could be replaced with a search button or be hidden, when Cortana was available, the search function was replaced with the digital assistant. The Task View button allowed users to quickly view their running apps and desktops. A button to open the Action Center was also added on the left hand side of the clock, before being moved to the right hand side in Windows 10, version 1607. Additionally, the taskbar would now change when Windows was set to tablet mode, hiding the pinned and running apps and collapsing the search bar into a search icon. It would also show a back button.

The taskbar in Windows 10 version 1507, in desktop mode
The taskbar in Windows 10 version 1507, in tablet mode
The taskbar in Windows 10 version 22H2, in desktop mode. New features got added to the taskbar like News and Interests, and Search Highlights (prev. called Search spotlight) and are shown by default on a clean install. The shell integration with Cortana was also removed and replaced with a search bar.
The taskbar in Windows 10, in Tablet (handheld) mode, on version 22H2
The taskbar in Windows 11, in version 24H2, with the icons at the center by default. The network, volume, and power icons in the notification area have been merged into a single Quick Settings button.
The taskbar in Windows 11, in version 24H2, with the icons at the left

=== Taskbar elements ===
- The Start button, a button that invokes the Start menu (or the Start screen in Windows 8.1). It appears in Windows 9x, Windows NT 4.0 and all its successors, except Windows 8 and Windows Server 2012.
- The Quick Launch bar, introduced on Windows 95 and Windows NT 4.0 through the Windows Desktop Update for Internet Explorer 4 and bundled with Windows 95 OSR 2.5 Windows 98, contains shortcuts to applications. Windows provides default entries, such as Launch Internet Explorer Browser, and the user or third-party software may add any further shortcuts that they choose. A single click on the application's icon in this area launches the application. This section may not always be present: for example it is turned off by default in Windows XP and Windows 7.
- The Windows shell places a taskbar button on the taskbar whenever an application creates an unowned window: that is, a window that does not have a parent and that is created according to normal Windows user interface guidelines. Typically all Single Document Interface applications have a single taskbar button for each open window, although modal windows may also appear there.
  - Windows 98 and Windows Desktop Update for Windows 95 introduced the ability to minimize foreground windows by clicking their button on the taskbar. They also introduced DeskBands (band objects).
  - Windows 2000 introduced balloon notifications.
  - Windows Me added an option to disable moving or resizing the taskbar.
  - Windows XP introduced taskbar grouping, which can group the taskbar buttons of several windows from the same application into a single button. This button pops up a menu listing all the grouped windows when clicked. This keeps the taskbar from being overcrowded when many windows are open at once.
  - Windows Vista introduced window previews which show thumbnail views of the application in real-time. This capability is provided by the Desktop Window Manager. When pointing to the Start button, its tooltip now says simply "Start" instead of "Click here to begin".
  - Windows 7 introduced jumplists which are menus that provide shortcuts to recently opened documents, frequently opened documents, folders paths (in case of Windows Explorer), or various options (called Tasks) which apply to that specific program or pinned website shortcut. Jump lists appear when the user right-clicks on an icon in the taskbar or drags the icon upwards with the mouse left click. Recent and frequent files and folders can be pinned inside the jump list.
  - Windows 7 introduced the ability to pin applications to the taskbar so that buttons for launching them appear when they are not running. Previously, the Quick Launch was used to pin applications to the taskbar; however, running programs appeared as a separate button.
  - Windows 7 removed several classic taskbar features.
  - Windows 11 removed taskbar grouping, possibly to have the functionality to move the taskbar to the left side of the screen, etc., but the old taskbar could be reactivated.
- Deskbands are minimized functional, long-running programs, such as Windows Media Player. Programs that minimize to deskbands are not displayed in the taskbar.
- The notification area is the portion of the taskbar that displays icons for system and program features that have no presence on the desktop as well as the time and the volume icon. It contains mainly icons that show status information, though some programs, such as Winamp, use it for minimized windows. By default, this is located in the bottom-right of the primary monitor (or bottom-left on languages of Windows that use right-to-left reading order), or at the bottom of the taskbar if docked vertically. The clock appears here, and applications can put icons in the notification area to indicate the status of an operation or to notify the user about an event. For example, an application might put a printer icon in the status area to show that a print job is under way, or a display driver application may provide quick access to various screen resolutions. The notification area is commonly referred to as the system tray, which Microsoft states is wrong, although the term is sometimes used in Microsoft documentation, articles, software descriptions, and even applications from Microsoft such as Bing Desktop. Raymond Chen suggests the confusion originated with systray.exe, a small application that controlled some icons within the notification area in Windows 95. The notification area is also referred to as the status area by Microsoft. In the current edition of Microsoft Writing Style Guide, Microsoft has clarified that beginning with Windows 11, system tray is now the preferred term, while notification area is the term used in Windows 10 and Windows 8.
  - In older versions of Windows the notification area icons were limited to 16 colors. Windows Me added support for high color notification area icons.
  - Starting with Windows XP, the user can choose to always show or hide some icons, or hide them if inactive for some time. A button allows the user to reveal all the icons.
  - Starting with Windows Vista, the taskbar notification area is split into two areas: one reserved for system icons including clock, volume, network and power; the other for applications.
  - Starting with Windows 7, the system icons and applications are shown in the same area again.
  - Starting with Windows 11, the separate volume, network, and power icons are combined into a single button that opens a quick settings menu when clicked. The clock and notification center buttons are also combined.
- Since the Windows 95 Desktop Update, the Quick Launch bar featured Show desktop as one of its default shortcuts which automatically minimizes all opened applications, redundant with the Winkey-D key combination. On Windows 7, a dedicated Show desktop button was placed to the right of the notification area and could not be removed. With the "Peek" option enabled, hovering over the button hides all opened windows to expose the desktop (leaving outlines of them on-screen). On Windows 10, the "Show desktop" widget changed yet again, being reduced to a narrow iconless strip at the far right of the taskbar. On Windows 11, the "Show Desktop" widget can be disabled from the taskbar settings.

=== Customization ===
The Windows taskbar can be modified by users in several ways. The position of the taskbar can be changed to appear on any edge of the primary display. Up to and including Windows Server 2008, the taskbar is constrained to single display, although third-party utilities such as UltraMon allow it to span multiple displays. When the taskbar is displayed vertically on versions of Windows prior to Windows Vista, the Start menu button will only display the text "Start" or translated equivalent if the taskbar is wide enough to show the full text. However, the edge of the taskbar (in any position) can be dragged to control its height (width for a vertical taskbar); this is especially useful for a vertical taskbar to show window titles next to the window icons.

Users can resize the height (or width when displayed vertically) of the taskbar up to half of the display area. To avoid inadvertent resizing or repositioning of the taskbar, Windows XP and later lock the taskbar by default. When unlocked, "grips" are displayed next to the movable elements which allow grabbing with the mouse to move and size. These grips slightly decrease amount of available space in the taskbar.

The taskbar as a whole can be hidden until the mouse pointer is moved to the display edge, or has keyboard focus. The Windows 7+ taskbar does not allow pinning any arbitrary folder to the taskbar, it gets pinned instead to the jumplist of a pinned Explorer shortcut, however third party utilities such as Winaero's Taskbar Pinner can be used to pin any type of shortcut to the taskbar.

=== Desktop toolbars ===
Other toolbars, known as "Deskbands", may be added to the taskbar. This feature, along with many other taskbar features is currently absent in Windows 11. Windows includes the following deskbands but does not display them by default (except the Quick Launch toolbar in certain versions and configurations).

- Address. Contains an address bar similar to that found in Internet Explorer. (not available in Windows XP SP3, due to legal restrictions).
- Windows Media Player. Optionally shown when the Windows Media Player is minimized.(Windows XP, Windows Vista)
- Links. Shortcuts to items located in the user's Links folder. Usually shortcuts to internet sites.
- Tablet PC Input Panel. Contains a button to show the Tablet PC input panel for ink text entry.
- Desktop. Contains shortcuts to items contained on the user's desktop. Since the taskbar is always shown, this provides easy access to desktop items without having to minimize applications.
- Quick Launch. Contains shortcuts to Internet Explorer, email applications and a link to display the desktop. Windows Vista adds a link to the Flip 3D feature.
- Language. Contains shortcuts to quickly change the desired language for the keyboard to follow.

In addition to deskbands, Windows supports "Application Desktop Toolbars" (also called "appbands") that supports creating additional toolbars that can dock to any side of the screen, and cannot be overlaid by other applications.

Users can add additional toolbars that display the contents of folders. The display for toolbars that represent folder items (such as Links, Desktop and Quick Launch) can be changed to show large icons and the text for each item. Prior to Windows Vista, the Desktop Toolbars could be dragged off the taskbar and float independently, or docked to a display edge. Windows Vista greatly limited, but did not eliminate the ability to have desktop toolbar not attached to the taskbar. Windows 7 has deprecated the use of Floating Deskbands altogether; they only appear pinned into the taskbar.

- Upon opening the taskbar properties on Windows 95 and Windows 98 whilst holding down the CTRL key, an extra tab for DeskBar Options is shown, but no part of it can be used. The DeskBar option was a feature that was never included within these versions of Windows.

== macOS ==
Classic Mac OS did not display a taskbar onscreen by default. Application switching prior to Mac OS 8.5 was done by clicking on an application's window or via a pull-down menu at the right end of the menu bar. Prior to version 8.5 the menu's title was the icon of the foreground application. Version 8.5 introduced the ability to optionally also display the application name and to "tear off" the menu by dragging the title with the mouse. The torn off menu was displayed as a palette. The palette window could be configured using AppleScript to appear much like a taskbar, with no title bar and fixed to one edge of the screen. No control panel was provided by Apple to access this functionality, but third-party developers quickly wrote applications that allowed users unfamiliar with AppleScript to customize their application palettes. Third party taskbars such as DragThing were a popular category of shareware on these systems.

The Dock, as featured in macOS and its predecessor NeXTSTEP, is also a kind of taskbar. The macOS Dock is application-oriented instead of window-oriented. Each running application is represented by one icon in the Dock regardless of how many windows it has on screen. A textual menu can be opened by right-clicking on the dock icon that gives access to an application's windows. Mac OS X 10.2 added the ability for an application to add items of its own to this menu. Minimized windows also appear in the dock, in the rightmost section, represented by a real-time graphical thumbnail of the window's contents. The trash can is also represented in the Dock, as a universal metaphor for deletion. For example, dragging selected text to the trash should remove the text from the document and create a clipping file in the trash.

The right side of macOS's Menu bar also typically contains several notification widgets and quick access functions, called Menu extras.

The default Dock in macOS Sequoia in Light Mode

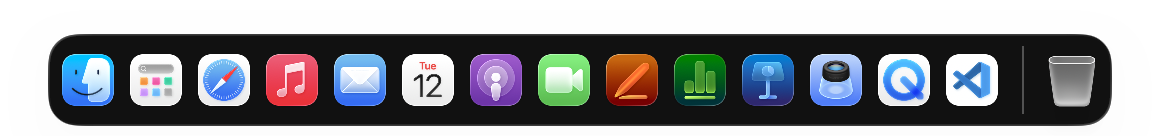
Example of Dock in macOS Tahoe in Dark Mode

== Unix-like operating systems ==
=== KDE Plasma ===
In KDE Plasma 5, taskbar uses Widgets as elements in taskbar. In the update 5.20 (November 2020) they updated the taskbar to look more like Windows 10 by only displaying icons by default and grouping application windows together.

The new taskbar of Plasma 5.20

=== GNOME ===
GNOME 2 used its own type of taskbar, known as panels (the program responsible for them is therefore called gnome-panel). By default, GNOME 2 usually contains two full-width panels at the top and bottom of the screen. The top panel usually contains navigation menus labeled Applications, Places, and System in that order. These menus hold links to common applications, areas of the file system, and system preferences and administration utilities, respectively.

Default top panel appearance from Ubuntu 6.10 to 8.04
Default bottom panel from Ubuntu 6.10 to 8.04

The top panel usually contains a clock and notification area, while the bottom panel contains buttons for navigating between virtual desktops, the window list proper, and a button which minimizes all windows (similarly to Windows' Show desktop button). The contents of panels are handled by widgets called panel applets, which can consist of application shortcuts, search tools, or other tools. The contents of the panels can be moved, removed, or configured in other ways.

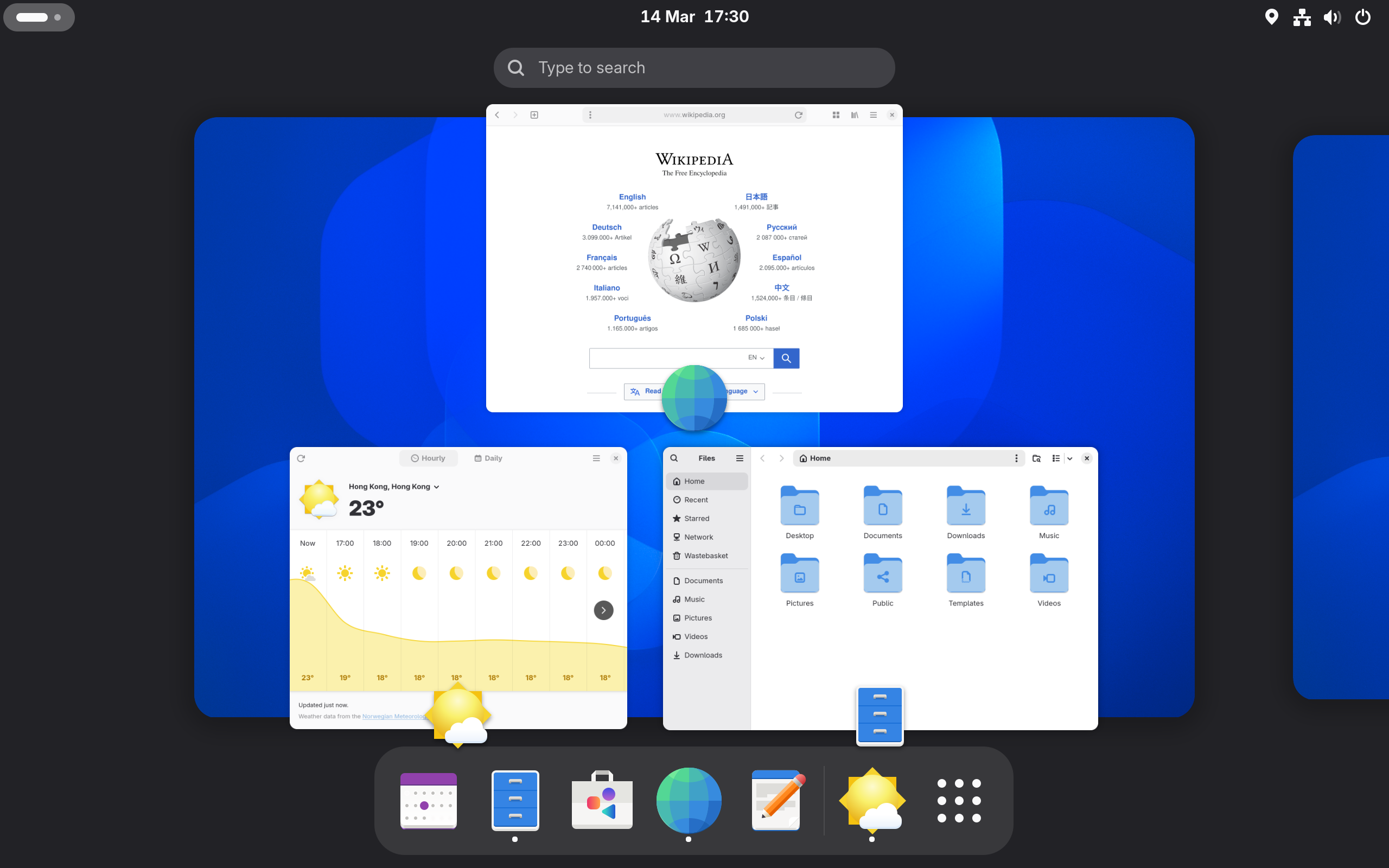
GNOME Shell Activities Overview which showcases the Dash

In GNOME 3, panels are replaced by GNOME Shell, which consists of a bar across the top of the screen with an Activities button on the left, a clock in the centre, and a notification area on the right. GNOME Shell does not contain a traditional taskbar; users can manage windows, virtual desktops, and launch applications from either a "Dash" on the side of the screen, or by searching from Activities Overview, which is displayed by clicking on the Activities button. GNOME 3.8 introduces Classic Mode, which re-implements certain aspects of GNOME 2's desktop as an alternate desktop environment that can be selected at the login screen.

=== Other Unix environments ===
These desktop environments provide their own implementation of a taskbar:

- Cinnamon
- MATE
- LXDE
- Xfce
- Trinity Desktop (based on KDE3's Kicker)

Standalone window managers that provide an integrated taskbar include:

- Fluxbox
- FVWM95
- IceWM
- qvwm
- WindowLab
- Window Maker
- JWM (Joe's Window Manager)

Programs that offer standalone taskbars for desktop environments or window managers without one include Avant Window Navigator, pypanel, fbpanel, perlpanel, tint2, and others.
