= LaunchBar =

Third-party application launcher for macOS

- Developer: Objective Development Software GmbH
- Initial release: 1996
- Stable release: 6.23 (March 20, 2026; 8 days ago) [±]
- Written in: Objective-C
- Operating system: macOS
- Available in: English, German
- Type: Application launcher
- License: Proprietary
- Website: https://www.obdev.at/products/launchbar/index.html

LaunchBar is an application launcher for macOS. It provides access to user's applications and files, by entering short abbreviations of the searched item's name. It uses an adaptive algorithm that 'learns' a user's preferred abbreviations for a particular application. For example, after training, Adobe Photoshop may be launched by simply typing 'pho' and Time Machine can be opened by typing 'tm' even though that sequence of characters does not appear anywhere in the name of the application.

LaunchBar also provides capabilities beyond application launching, such as file management and piping the current selection to a command line utility, along with clipboard management and a built-in calculator. LaunchBar is distributed as crippleware shareware - full usage of the application requires paying the registration fee, but up to 7 abbreviations may be used per session without paying anything.

According to user interface researcher Bruce Tognazzini, "LaunchBar should be able to outperform a visual interface for complex, repetitive switching sequences by an expert user".

== History ==
LaunchBar began as a series of shell scripts for the NeXTSTEP platform, then migrated to OPENSTEP where it was developed into a full-fledged application. It was ported to Mac OS X in 2001 as LaunchBar 3.

In 2005, Apple introduced Spotlight, which took over LaunchBar's default position at the top-right corner of the screen. In response, LaunchBar was changed to display its window at the center of the screen, below the menu bar.

In 2014, LaunchBar 6 was released with a redesigned interface, additional indexing rules and built-in actions, live web searches and usage statistics.

Since then, LaunchBar has continued to evolve with improvements such as Dark Mode support, enhanced Finder tag handling, and an Action Editor for creating and customizing actions using various scripting languages like AppleScript, JavaScript, Ruby, Python, and PHP.

== See also ==
- Comparison of application launchers
