= Launchy =

Application launch utility for Windows

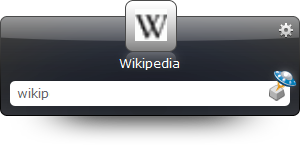
- Original author: Josh Karlin
- Release: January 22, 2007
- Final release: 2.5 / April 4, 2010
- Written in: C++ (Qt)
- Platform: Windows, Mac OS X, FreeBSD, and Linux
- Type: Application launcher; Linux on the desktop
- License: GNU General Public License
- Website: www.launchy.net

Launchy is a free and open-source application launcher for Windows, Mac OS X, FreeBSD and Linux. It indexes shortcuts in the start menu, and files in specific folders, to allow quicker access to programs without opening the start menu or browsing to folders.

== Program usage ==
Launchy automatically loads on boot and waits for the user to call it by pressing Alt + Space or a custom hotkey. The user then starts typing the name of the program or file they wish to launch. Launchy automatically searches its list of programs for the closest match as the user types. When it finds the desired program, the user hits Enter and it is automatically launched.

Launchy can add folders and file formats to its catalog for indexing, so it can launch almost anything on a computer, including programs, URLs (also from bookmarks) and documents; as well as run Google, Wikipedia, MSN and Yahoo searches, bringing the results up in the default browser.

Launchy can be extended with plug-ins.

== Platform ==
Launchy was originally written in C# (ver. 0.5), and in C++ since version 0.6. The latest version, 2.0, has been completely rewritten using Qt. This has resulted in incompatibility with older skins and plugins.

== Included plugins ==
The following plugins are included with the 2.0 release:

=== Controly ===
- Adds control panel items to the catalog

=== Weby ===
- Allows web search
- Can launch URLs, also from bookmarks

=== Calcy ===
- A simple calculator

== Community plugins ==
- Ampy controls Winamp, iTunes and foobar2000.
- gCal Plugin posts events to Google Calendar.
- iTuny controls iTunes.
- Killy terminates tasks by name.
- Launchy# allows loading of plugins written in a .NET language.
- MathyResurrected adds additional mathematical capabilities.
- PuTTY Launchy Plugin launches saved PuTTY sessions.
- PyLaunchy allows loading of plugins written in the Python programming language.

== Plugin development ==
Launchy 2 has a C++ API for developing extension plugins that add new types of objects to the catalog.

Community-developed bindings for other programming languages are provided as plugins:

- PyLaunchy allows developing Python programming language plugins.
- Launchy# allows developing plugins in .NET languages.

== Awards ==
=== 2007 ===
- SourceForge.Net Community Choice Awards, Honorable Mention: Best New Project
- PC World 15 Best Downloads of the Year: Powertools
- CNet Download.Com Top Ten Downloads of the Year

== See also ==
- Comparison of application launchers
