= Dock (macOS) =

Graphical user interface feature by Apple

- Developer: Apple Inc.
- Release: 2000; 26 years ago
- Operating system: macOS
- Service name: Dock.app
- Type: Taskbar
- Website: support.apple.com/guide/mac-help/open-apps-from-the-dock-mh35859/mac

The Dock is a prominent feature of the graphical user interface of macOS. It is used to launch applications and to switch between running applications. The Dock is also a prominent feature of macOS's predecessor NeXTSTEP and OPENSTEP operating systems. The earliest known implementations of a dock are found in operating systems such as RISC OS and NeXTSTEP. iOS has its own version of the Dock for the iPhone and iPod Touch, as does iPadOS for the iPad.

Apple applied for a US patent for the design of the Dock in 1999 and was granted the patent in October 2008, nearly a decade later. Any application can be dragged and dropped onto the Dock to add it to the dock, and any application can be dragged from the dock to remove it, except for Finder and Trash, which are permanent fixtures as the leftmost and rightmost items (or highest and lowest items if the Dock is vertically oriented), respectively. Part of the macOS Core Services, Dock.app is located at /System/Library/CoreServices/.

== Overview ==
OPENSTEP Dock

In NeXTSTEP and OPENSTEP, the Dock is an application launcher that holds icons for frequently used programs. The icon for the Workspace Manager and the Recycler are always visible. The Dock indicates if a program is not running by showing an ellipsis below its icon. If the program is running, there is no ellipsis on the icon. In macOS, running applications have been variously identified by a small black triangle (Mac OS X 10.0-10.4) a blue-tinted luminous dot (Mac OS X 10.5-10.7), a horizontal light bar (OS X 10.8 and 10.9), and a simple black or white dot (OS X 10.10-present).

In macOS, however, the Dock is used as a repository for any program or file in the operating system. It can hold any number of items and resizes them dynamically to fit while using magnification to better view smaller items. By default, it appears on the bottom edge of the screen, but it can also instead be placed on the left or right edges of the screen if the user wishes. Applications that do not normally keep icons in the Dock will still appear there when running and remain until they are quit. These features are unlike those of the dock in the NeXT operating systems where the capacity of the Dock is dependent on display resolution. This may be an attempt to recover some Shelf functionality since macOS inherits no other such technology from NeXTSTEP. (Minimal Shelf functionality has been implemented in the Finder.)

The changes to the dock bring its functionality also close to that of Apple's Newton OS Button Bar, as found in the MessagePad 2x00 series and the likes. Applications can be dragged in and out of the Extras Drawer, a Finder-like app, onto the bar. Also, when the screen is put into landscape mode, the user can choose to position the Button Bar at the right or left side of the screen, like the Dock in macOS.

The macOS Dock also has extended menus that control applications without making them visible on screen. On most applications it has simple options such as Quit, Keep In Dock, Remove From Dock, and other options. Some applications use these menus for other purposes, such as iTunes, which uses this menu as a way for a user to control certain playback options. Other Applications include changing the status of an online alias (MSN, AIM/iChat etc.) or automatically saving the changes that have been made in a document. There is no current application with this feature made available for macOS. Docklings (in Mac OS X 10.4 or earlier) can also be opened by using the right-mouse button, if the mouse has one, but most of the time either clicking and holding or control-click will bring the menu up.

Stacks in grid view

In Mac OS X Leopard, docklings were replaced by Stacks. Stacks "stack" files into a small organized folder on the Dock, and they can be opened by left-clicking. Stacks could be shown in three ways: a "fan", a "grid", or a "list", which is similar to docklings. In grid view, the folders in that stack can be opened directly in that stack without the need to open Finder.

In iOS, the dock is used to store applications and, since iOS 4, folders containing applications. Unlike the macOS dock, a maximum of 4 icons can be placed in the dock on the iPhone and the iPod Touch. The maximum for the iPad however is 16 icons (13 apps and 3 recently opened apps). The size of the dock on iOS cannot be changed.

When an application on the Dock is launched by clicking on it, it will jump until the software is finished loading. Additionally, when an application requires attention from a user, it will jump even higher until its icon is clicked and the user attends to its demands.

== Design and feature history ==
The Dock, as it appears in OS X 10.8 to 10.9

The Dock, as it appears in macOS Sequoia

=== macOS ===
The original version of the Dock, found in Mac OS X Public Beta to 10.0, was a white translucent bar mounted to the bottom of the screen, with pinstripes typical of the Aqua look. Running applications were denoted using a black triangle underneath the application icon, and a black line was used to divide applications and documents on the left and right side of the screen, respectively.

Mac OS X 10.1 added support for setting the Dock on both the left and right side of the screen, which was previously only possible to change with the Terminal, alongside updated animations. It otherwise remained the same.

Mac OS X Jaguar (10.2) removed the pinstripes from the Dock, leaving only a translucent white bar.

Mac OS X Leopard (10.5) changed the Dock from a flat translucent bar to a three-dimensional glass-textured shelf with real-time reflections, resembling Sun Microsystems' Project Looking Glass application dock. Application indicators were changed from a black triangle to a blurred blue orb under running applications, and the dividing line between applications and documents was changed to a thick dashed outline. The vertically-mounted Dock appearance was changed to a black translucent texture with a white rounded outline and a white dot for running applications.

Mac OS X Snow Leopard (10.6) made it so that contextual menus which come out of Dock icons now have more options and have a new look, with a semi-transparent charcoal background and white text. It also made it possible to minimize apps by clicking on their icons in the dock.

OS X Lion (10.7) added the option to disable running application indicators, albeit disabled by default. It also updates the animation of opening an app to resemble iOS.

OS X Mountain Lion (10.8) tweaked the Dock's appearance to resemble frosted glass by reducing the opacity of the item reflections and increasing the overall blur intensity. The update also rounded the corners of the Dock, simplified and corrected the perspective of the dividing line between applications and documents, and changed the running application indicators to blue glowing rectangles on the edge of the Dock rather than blurred orbs floating beneath the application. However, the vertical Dock was not updated to match these changes.

OS X Mavericks (10.9) updated the vertical Dock to match the horizontal appearance more closely by changing the color to a white translucent material, changing the running application indicators to vertical blue lines, and updating the divider between applications and documents to match the simplified line from OS X Mountain Lion. The update also improved multi-monitor support for the Dock.

OS X Yosemite (10.10) overhauled the Dock again, returning to a two-dimensional flat rectangle similar to that used from Mac OS X Jaguar to Mac OS X Leopard and unifying the appearance of the horizontal and vertical Dock. Running app indicators were changed to a simple black dot, and the background underneath the Dock was changed to use the vibrancy effect introduced with the update. Additionally, the "poof" animation used when items are removed from the Dock was removed, instead being replaced with a simple tooltip reading "Remove" while dragging. The update also introduced a dark mode option which inverts the colors of the Dock.

macOS Mojave (10.14) introduced dark mode to the rest of the user interface, with the design of the Dock in dark mode using the version already present in OS X Yosemite onwards. The vibrancy effect in light mode was slightly darkened, and the dock recoved [sic?] a new section for unpinned recently used applications, but the Dock remained otherwise unchanged.

In macOS Big Sur (11.0), the Dock was updated to match the design of the iPadOS Dock more closely, by adding a small bottom margin and rounding all four corners rather than just the top corners, creating the appearance of being detached from the bottom of the screen. The border radius of the Dock was also increased to be rounder.

In macOS Tahoe (26), the Dock was updated to match the Liquid Glass design language introduced with the update. The Dock's internal padding was slightly increased, and the vibrancy effect used since OS X Yosemite was changed to a glass-like texture with a lower blur radius and less tinting from the system theme.

In macOS Golden Gate (27), the Dock now shows Active Background Processes, alongside redesigned icons and an adjustable blur.

=== iOS ===
In iPhone OS 1 to 3, the Dock used a metal texture similar to the front of the Power Mac G5 (2003-2005) and Mac Pro (2006-2012 and 2019-2026).

iPhone OS 3.2 for iPad and iOS 4 to 6 adopted the glass shelf Dock design from Mac OS X 10.5 to 10.7.

iOS 7 introduced an OS X 10.10-like Dock, which occupied the entire length of the screen.

In iOS 11, the Dock for both the iPad and the iPhone X was changed to more closely resemble the macOS dock, by no longer spanning the entire screen width and removing app name subtitles from pinned items.

== Related software ==
Classic Mac OS had a Dock-like application called Launcher, which was first introduced with Macintosh Performa models in 1993 and later included as part of System 7.5.1, which performed the same basic function. Third-party utilities like DragThing also provided Dock-like functionality in earlier versions.

MacOS was not the first operating system to implement Dock-like features. RISC OS contains a feature called the Icon bar, which is remarkably similar to the macOS Dock. The Icon Bar was first implemented in 1987 for the first version of RISC OS, named Arthur.

Microsoft implemented a simplified dock feature in the Windows Desktop Update that shipped with Internet Explorer 4. This Quick Launch toolbar feature remained until Windows 7, where it was replaced by the superbar, which implements functionality similar to the macOS Dock. Windows shell replacement LiteStep featured a Wharf akin to that of NeXTSTEP.

Various docks are also used in Linux and BSD. Some examples are Window Maker (which emulates the look and feel of the NeXTstep GUI), Docky, and Avant Window Navigator, KXDocker (amongst others) for KDE and various others like gDesklets, adesklets, AfterStep's Wharf (a derivation from the NeXTSTEP UI), iTask NG (a module used with some Enlightenment-based Linux distributions such as gOS) and Blackbox's Slit.

== Criticism ==
Bruce Tognazzini, a usability consultant who worked for Apple in the 1980s and 1990s before Mac OS X was developed, wrote an article in 2001 listing ten problems he saw with the Dock. This article was updated in 2004, removing two of the original criticisms and adding a new one. One of his concerns was that the Dock uses too much screen space. Another was that icons only show their labels when the pointer hovers over them, so similar-looking folders, files, and windows are difficult to distinguish. Tognazzini also criticized the fact that when icons are dragged out of the Dock, they vanish with no easy way to get them back; he called this behavior "object annihilation".

John Siracusa, writing for Ars Technica, also pointed out some issues with the Dock around the releases of Mac OS X Public Beta in 2000. He noted that because the Dock is centered, adding and removing icons changes the location of the other icons. In a review of Mac OS X v10.0 the following year, he also noted that the Dock does far too many tasks than it should for optimum ease-of-use, including launching apps, switching apps, opening files, and holding minimized windows. Siracusa further criticized the Dock after the release of Mac OS X v10.5, noting that it was made less usable for the sake of eye-candy. Siracusa criticized the 3D look and reflections, the faint blue indicator for open applications, and less distinguishable files and folders.

Thom Holwerda, a managing editor OSNews, stated some concerns with the Dock, including the facts that it grows in both directions, holds the Trash icon, and has no persistent labels. Holwerda also criticized the revised Dock appearance in Mac OS X v10.5.

== See also ==
- Taskbar
