= Personal Antivirus =

Rogue security software

Personal Antivirus is rogue anti-virus software created by a company named Innovagest (sometimes referred to as "Innovagest 2000"), and is related to other rogue software. It claims to be an anti-virus program, but instead merely displays false warnings about virus and spyware infections, and demands money to clean these infections.

== Description ==
A common way that Personal Antivirus installs itself on a computer is through a malicious pop-up ad (though it may also be installed as part of a malicious video codec package). When a user visits a website hosting a Personal Antivirus ad, a pop-up window appears, claiming to be scanning the computer for virus infections. This "scan" inevitably finds a number of virus infections. Afterward, the user is told that they need to buy Personal Antivirus to clean these infections, and is directed to a site that accepts payments. If the user decides to buy and install the program, Personal Antivirus claims to have repaired the infections, but also regularly advertises additional programs or demands more money at regular intervals.

== New York Times Web Site ==
In September, 2009, the New York Times web site unwittingly started to randomly display ads related to Personal Antivirus. The New York Times uses a mix of in-house advertising and advertising networks to display ads on their web site. The person responsible for the ads originally requested that the New York Times run ads for Vonage VoIP service. Because Vonage had previously advertised directly with the New York Times, the ads were approved and were delivered via a third-party ad network that was unfamiliar to the Times.

On September 11, 2009, the Vonage ads that were originally approved switched to Personal Antivirus ads. These ads continued to be displayed throughout the following weekend. The ads were eventually stopped when the New York Times temporarily disabled ads displayed by third-party networks and investigated the source of the Personal Antivirus ads.

The New York Times later advised readers that using a reputable, properly-updated anti-virus program would likely resolve any lingering infections from Personal Antivirus. They also discovered that during the same weekend, other sites had experienced similar malicious ads, possibly including the web site of the San Francisco Chronicle.
