= Tapsnake =

Scareware

Tapsnake is a scareware scam involving coercion to buy protection from a non-existent computer virus that has been distributed in various ways.

Tapsnake was first identified in 2010 as a trojanized version of a simple Snake-style game distributed through unofficial Android application marketplaces. Once installed, the application operated as a functional game but additionally collected the device’s GPS coordinates. These location data were periodically transmitted to a remote server and could be accessed through a companion program known as GPS Spy. The malware required manual installation by the user and did not include self-replication capabilities, leading security researchers to classify it as a trojan rather than a worm. At the time, the discovery of Tapsnake contributed to early concerns about Android’s open application-distribution model and its susceptibility to sideloaded applications embedded with malicious code. Although the infection rate of the original Tapsnake trojan was relatively low, it represented one of the first documented Android spyware programs capable of transmitting continuous location information without the user’s consent.

The name Tapsnake comes from the computer game Snaker, which has been revised such that the 'snake' responds to touchscreen taps by the user. The game is the front end of a trojan, spyware. An unsuspecting mobile device user is persuaded to load the "fun, free app," and then the person who wishes to monitor their movements must load a version which enables reception of location reports at 15-minute intervals.

The most recent incarnation is enabled by activating a pop-up ad on an otherwise innocuous website. The user then receives dire warnings as to what the virus may do to them, is offered protection at a price via download (to a mobile device), and is promised increased speed and performance as an additional perk. Android seems to be the operating system most targeted, though iOS attacks are also threatened. The actual game and embedded spyware do not seem to be present at all in this scenario, except in the form of a threat. Blog-advisors seem to agree that the safest course of action is to simply close the advert, 'clicking' on as few things as possible. The intent is to coerce to defraud, in this instance, and not to monitor movement.
