= Jv16 PowerTools =

jv16 PowerTools
- Developer: Macecraft Software
- Stable release: 8.1.0.1564 / 27 April 2023
- Written in: Object Pascal (Delphi)
- Operating system: Microsoft Windows
- Type: Utility software
- License: Shareware
- Website: https://jv16powertools.com/

jv16 PowerTools, developed by Macecraft Software, is a utility software suite for the Microsoft Windows operating system designed to fix common Windows errors, clean old, unneeded junk from the system, and make computers start faster. jv16 PowerTools has been reviewed by Chip.de, PC World, Tech Advisor, Laptop Mag, Softpedia, and various tech sites and blogs.

== Features ==
jv16 PowerTools' main features are System Cleaner (which includes registry cleaner functionality) and an uninstaller called Software Uninstaller. In addition, the software has features such as Finder, Big File Finder, Duplicate Finder, File Renamer, File Splitter, File Merger, File Deleter, File Wiper, Task Manager, Web Blocker, and Internet Optimizer. jv16 PowerTools is available in 19 languages.

== Development ==
jv16 PowerTools was developed in 2003 by the founder of Macecraft Software, Jouni Vuorio (later changed his name to Jouni Flemming) after he developed a freeware software called RegCleaner.

Crowdfunding campaign

In December 2013, Macecraft created a crowdfunding campaign on Indiegogo aiming to make jv16 PowerTools available as open-source. However, the campaign didn't reach its financial goal, making jv16 PowerTools continue as shareware instead.

== Critical reception ==
PC World's Steve Bass gave an expert rating of 3.5/5 stars in 2008 and commented that jv16 PowerTools 'will tell you all you ever wanted to know about Windows Registry, but you probably won't need all of its tools'. In 2010, Ian Harac called it a "Swiss Army Knife" of Utilities, but also commented that 'despite a wide array of useful features, it's somewhat hampered by a clumsy and uninformative interface'.

Laptop Mag gave an editor's rating of 4.5/5 stars in 2009 and the verdict was that jv16 PowerTools is 'a solid solution provided that its somewhat intimidating interface doesn't turn you off.'

Softpedia gave jv16 PowerTools an editor rating of 4.5/5 stars in 2017 and commented that the software is 'a good place to start tweaking some of your system's components.'

Tech Advisor gave the verdict that jv16 PowerTools has a little variable in quality, but also commented that 'the sheer weight of features means it's still worth a look' in 2019.

Chip.de's editorial team rated jv16 PowerTools as satisfactory, graded it 2.3 out of 5 stars, and mentioned 'sensible tuning modules and monitoring of LAN traffic' as its advantages. However, they noted 'excessive price' as its disadvantage.
