= Innovative Marketing =

Defunct Ukrainian cybercrime company

Innovative Marketing, Inc., also known as Innovative Marketing Ukraine, was a cybercrime company based in Kyiv, Ukraine, founded by Shaileshkumar "Sam" Jain and Bjorn Sundin. The company developed and sold scareware anti-virus programs that claimed to detect and remove viruses from computers. The company's software was distributed by hackers who infected machines with scareware, as well as illegitimate ads on major websites. The company earned $180 million in revenue in 2009, and $500 million in the three years they sold malicious software. Jain and Sundin are both fugitives and are wanted by the FBI.

== See also ==
Rogue anti-virus programs developed by Innovative Marketing:

- SpySheriff
- WinFixer
- MS Antivirus
