= Macecraft Software =

Software company

Macecraft, Inc.
- Type: Family business
- Industry: Software
- Founded: Helsinki (2001)
- Website: www.macecraft.com/

Macecraft Software is a Finnish computer software company founded in 2001 by Jouni Vuorio and Jani Vuorio. The company is mainly known for its utility software jv16 PowerTools. Other products include standalone registry cleaners, RegSupreme Pro and RegSupreme.

Before 2003, as a hobby Jouni Vuorio developed a freeware software called RegCleaner. The transition from creating freeware software to shareware products also generated heated discussion.

In December 2013, a crowdfunding campaign was launched at indiegogo with the aim of making Jv16 PowerTools free and open source. The Thunderclap Web site said that the campaign reached 252% of its goal of 500 supporters with 1,258 subscribers, but Macecraft said that the campaign did not reach its financial goal, so the software was not made free and open source. Instead, contributors were given software updates. The Macecraft discussion forum went offline for a prolonged period at about this time but eventually came back online, with apologies for the prolonged absence for maintenance.
