= Patrick Evans =

Patrick or Addy Evans may refer to:

- Patrick Evans (priest) (born 1943), Church of England clergyman
- Patrick Evans (cricketer) (born 1960), Guyanese cricketer
- Paddy Evans (cricketer) (born 1981), English cricketer
- Patrick Evans, developer of NightMare

== See also ==
- Pat Evans (disambiguation)
