= Advanced System Optimizer =

Software for Microsoft Windows

Advanced Software Optimizer
- Developer: Systweak
- Type: Computer performance
- Website: www.systweak.com/aso/

Advanced System Optimizer (formerly Advanced Vista Optimizer) is utility software for Microsoft Windows developed by Systweak (founded in 1999 by Shrishail Rana), intended to improve computer performance and speed.

== Features ==
Advanced System Optimizer's utilities include system cleaners, memory optimizers, junk data cleaners, privacy protectors, startup managers, security tools, and other maintenance tools. The software also includes utilities to repair missing or broken DLLs and erase files, and features a recommendation section that displays problems and actions that can improve PC performance.

The "single click care" option scans all areas of the computer for optimization. The optimization tab is used to free up memory of the computer. The startup manager is used to manage programs that load at the computer's startup.

The registry cleaner has 12 categories of registry errors to detect and delete registry errors.

The 2008 version had over 25 tools. It can be scheduled to run optimization without for user intervention.

== Reception ==
In a review for PC World, Preston Gralla praised the quality of the software suite's design, stating the tools perform as advertised. He noted the product's price as a drawback.
