= Magnetic Pages =

Disk magazine software

- Review of Magnetic Pages in a disk magazine which also uses Magnetic Pages
- Developer: Mark Gladding
- Release: 1990
- Final release: 1.30 / 1992; 34 years ago
- Operating system: AmigaOS
- Available in: English
- Type: Disk magazine software
- License: Proprietary

Magnetic Pages is a disk magazine creation software released in 1990 for the Commodore Amiga platform. The software was created by Mark Gladding, editor of the New Zealand disk magazine Amsmag. It primarily saw use in the English and German language Amiga scene throughout the 1990s.

== Features ==
Magnetic Pages consists of three programs: the Editor, which allows articles to be written and formatted; the Organiser, which is used to compile articles into a magazine; and the Displayer, which displays the magazine and is distributed to the end user. The full package was sold as shareware and retailed for $25 (USD), with a demo version limited to omit the save function.

Version 1.30 supported 8 or 16-colour screens containing a mixture of text and graphics, as well as all-graphics screens in any IFF ILBM format, including 4096-colour HAM6. Text formatting was supported, including bold, italic, colour, page background colour, and boxes. Hypertext was supported in the form of clickable buttons, as well as controls to move between pages of the article and sections of the magazine.

Other supported features included music support in MED and SoundTracker format, and the ability to search, save, print and screenshot articles. Both PAL and NTSC screenmodes were supported.

== History ==
Magnetic Pages was created in 1990 by Mark Gladding, editor of New Zealand Amiga User Group (Auckland) disk magazine Amsmag. The initial concept dates back to 1988, when Simon Frantzen suggested developing a piece of software to display articles in a format similar to a print magazine, including formatted text, in-line images, and page turning.

Mark initially developed a system which ran on custom ASCII control characters, which he used for around a year. However, using this system was time-consuming and not particularly user-friendly. A graphical user interface system was developed, which became Magnetic Pages.

Version 1.0 was submitted to Fred Fish on 23 September 1990, and released on Fish Disk #372. It was uploaded to Aminet on 8 October 1990. It was submitted to Amiga Format magazine in the UK, where it was previewed in their December 1990 issue before being sent out to various UK public domain providers.

Subsequent developments included bug fixes, optimizations, text search, and support for the MED music format.

The last release was version 1.30, created on 18 May 1992. The demo version was distributed on Fish Disk #684, and was uploaded to Aminet on 3 July 1992.

In 1994, version 2.0 of the software was in development, and an early version of this was used to produce Amsmag from May 1994 onward. The new version produced disk magazines which were faster and easier to use, and supported enhanced hypertext features, shape graphics, animations, user text input gadgets, variables, and triggers. Although planned as a commercial product, Commodore's bankruptcy announcement that month resulted in uncertainty for the platform's future, and Magnetic Pages V2.0 was never released.

== Disk magazines using Magnetic Pages ==
ShareWorld #7

Disk magazines which used Magnetic Pages included:

- Amiga Fire (German)
- Amsmag (English)
- Amy PD and Shareware Review (English)
- ShareWorld (English)
- Freizeit Technik Treff (German)
- NoCover (German)
- P.V.F.C (English)

== Reception ==
Early reviews of Magnetic Pages were favourable, generally praising its ease of use and graphical user interface.

German magazine Amiga Kickstart reviewed the software in depth for its July/August 1991 issue, contrasting it favourably to Christoph Franzen's ZeigE, the software used by German diskmags AmigaJUICE and GetiT, due to the user-friendly mouse-based interface. It was included in the German KICKSTART-PD collection as disk #336. Amiga DOS magazine likewise commented on the potential of the new software to disrupt the German disk magazine community's reliance on ZeigE, though noting that its extended feature set came at the cost of disk space.

In its September 1992 issue, Amiga Shopper gave Magnetic Pages V1.30 an in-depth review, describing it as "incredibly easy to use and produces a really professional-looking end product." It was rated a full 10/10. It was highly praised in later issues of the magazine, appearing in both the January 1993 issue's PD Awards for the best of 1992, and the March 1995 issue's list of top 100 public domain releases.

Amiga Format magazine also reviewed the software in its September 1992 issue, noting its ease of use and affordable price point. The following issue reported that it ranked #7 in top selling PD utilities at one distributor. It was also reviewed in the magazine's May 1994 issue, which rated the software 98%.

Amy PD and Shareware Review #4 (July 1993), a disk magazine which used Magnetic Pages, reviewed version V1.30 of software in depth, rating it 82%. The reviewer noted "Since starting to use MP I haven't once considered looking for something better. This, with refinemint, is the way disk magazines should be".

Over time, however, opinions of the software waned due to lack of updates. In the July 1996 issue of Amiga Shopper, a review of ShareWorld issue 6, which used Magnetic Pages V1.30, described the software as "an antiquated magazine engine" and "good in its day but is now showing its wrinkles." Likewise, in 1998, reviews of ShareWorld #9 in both CU Amiga and Amiga Format called the software outdated, with particular criticism of its limited 640x256 PAL screenmode (standard in 1992, but outdated by 1998). In 1996, the Dutch Amiga Magazine described it as lacking features of newer software DMC Gold.
