= Spy Wiper =

Malware program

Spy Wiper, also known as Mail Wiper and Spy Deleter, is a malware program that was fraudulently sold as an antispyware program.

In 2005, the Federal Trade Commission filed a civil suit against the companies Seismic Entertainment Productions, MailWiper Inc., and Spy Deleter Inc. The suit alleged the three companies illegally sold the fraudulent malware program, receiving over $2 million in revenue.

== See also ==
- Rogue software
