= Total Security =

Total Security may refer to:

- Total Security (TV series), 1997 TV series
- Total Security (malware)
