= Jain Shaileshkumar =

Indian entrepreneur, American fugitive, absconding since 2019

Sam P. Jain
- Born: February 10, 1970 (age 56)
- Occupation: Fugitive (as of April 4, 2023)

Jain Shaileshkumar (born February 10, 1970), better known as Sam P. Jain, is an Indian internet entrepreneur and former CEO of affiliate marketing network eFront, who is currently a fugitive with an arrest warrant in California. In 2000, eFront submitted fraudulent data to Media Metrix, a website ranking publisher. Former president of eFront Jerry Ziegler accused Jain of deliberately falsifying affiliate data, using tactics such as submitting companies which didn't respond to his affiliate offer as affiliates with the justification that "[i]f they won't respond to me, they won't respond to anyone". In 2001 Jain was involved in a scandal when ICQ instant messaging logs between him and other employees were leaked onto the internet. The logs detailed activities such as not paying websites that had hosted their banner ads and sending legal threats to websites that spoke poorly of eFront. On April 20, 2005, he was ordered to pay $3.1 million to Symantec for selling counterfeit software and violating intellectual property laws.

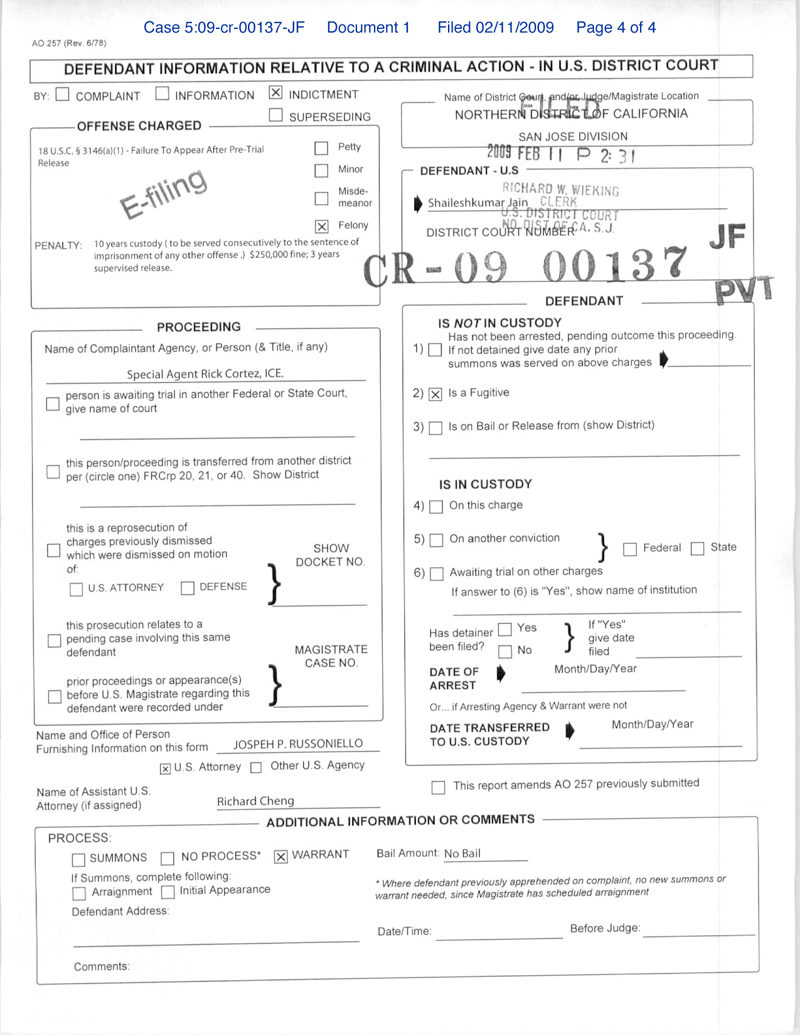
A bench warrant for Jain's arrest was entered into court records in California on February 11, 2009.

== Arrest warrant ==
Jain additionally has a criminal case pending in California resulting from his selling of counterfeit Symantec software, where he was charged with Criminal Copyright Infringement, Wire Fraud, Trafficking in Counterfeit Goods & Mail Fraud. Jain pleaded not guilty.

Jain operated several Internet-based companies including Discount Bob, Shifting Currents Financials, Inc., Innovative Marketing Inc., Professional Management Consulting Inc. and Shopenter.com, LLC.

In December 2008, Jain was listed as a defendant in the Federal Trade Commission's case against so-called "scareware" applications such as WinFixer. The case alleges that several companies scammed consumers into buying these applications through malware and banner ads.

In mid-December 2008 U.S. District Judge Richard D. Bennett fined Innovative Marketing $8,000 for each day that it continues to sell bogus scareware software on its website.

On January 26, 2009, a stay was removed for a bench warrant initially issued for Jain's arrest on January 12, 2009 by United States District Judge Ronald M. Whyte. The bench warrant was entered into court records on February 11, 2009. Jain is officially a fugitive from justice in the United States. The FBI is offering a reward for information that leads to his arrest or capture. In 2009, $14.8 million USD was seized from a Swiss bank account belonging to Jain by the US government.

== See also ==
- List of fugitives from justice who disappeared
