= Virus: The Game =

1997 video game

- Developer: Kidum Multimedia Ltd.
- Publishers: NA: Sir-Tech Software Inc.; EU: Telstar
- Platform: Microsoft Windows
- Release: NA: November 13, 1997; EU: 1997
- Genres: Action/Strategy, Shooter
- Modes: Single-player, Multiplayer

Virus: The Game is a strategy/action video game developed by Israeli studio Kidum Multimedia and published by Sir-Tech. The game levels take place in the user's hard drive, with files and directories being represented by 3D rooms through which the player navigates.

== Summary ==
The objective is to battle against 'viruses' that invade the user's directory structure and files. The game and its advertisement included warnings reminding the player that "it's just a game," and that the game is not actually causing harm to the computer's files. The user's graphic files are used as the wall texture and sound files are used as the background music.

== Marketing ==
A quasi-viral advertisement campaign for the game was started. The advertisement, named Russ, was viewed in the form of a downloaded .exe file. When the file was run, a full screen representation of the desktop appeared. The software then began simulating deletion of the Windows folder. When this process was complete, a message was slowly typed on screen saying "Thank god this is only a game..." A screen with the purchase information appeared on screen and then returned to the desktop. No damage is done to the computer during the advertisement. This advertisement was not well received, most likely due to the scareware tactic involved. Thus, most anti-virus programs detected and deleted it.

== Reception ==
Reception

Review scores
Publication	Score
Computer Games Strategy Plus	0.5/5
Computer Gaming World	1.5/5
Computer and Video Games	3/5
GameRevolution	C−
GameSpot	2.9/10
GameStar	28%
Next Generation	2/5
PC Gamer (US)	30%
PC Games (DE)	62%
PC Zone	49%

The critical reception was generally negative. GameSpot claimed that "Virus has all the appearances of a game that underwent numerous design changes but never really came together." Next Generation called it "an interesting concept, and one that makes it somewhat ironic the game has the problems it does."

GameSpot named the game as the runner-up for the 1997 "Worst Game of the Year" award, which ultimately went to Conquest Earth.
