= NightMare =

1990 scareware

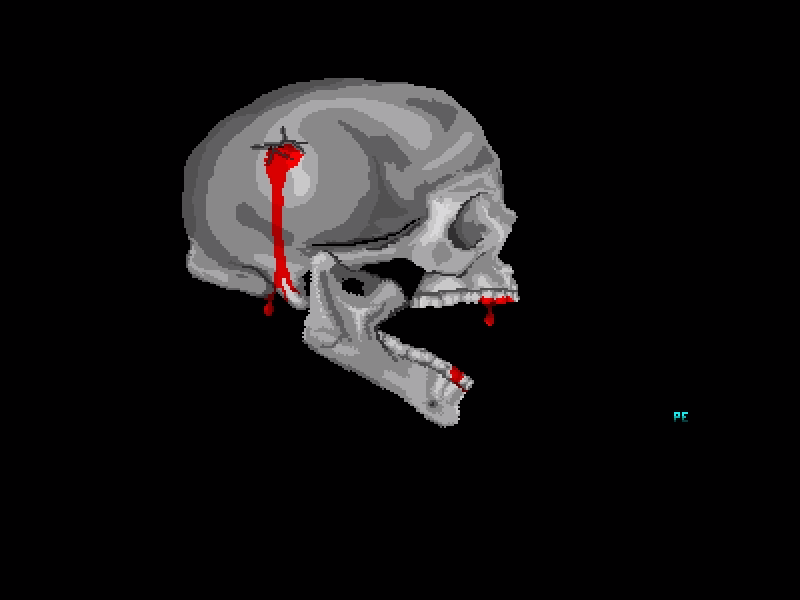
- The image displayed every five minutes.

Malware details
- Classification: Scareware
- Origin: Canada
- Authors: Patrick Evans

Technical details
- Platform: Amiga

NightMare is a scareware program distributed on the Fish Disks for the Amiga computer (Fish #448). It is generally credited to be the first scareware program of its type.

The program was developed by Patrick Evans (Nobleton, Ontario, Canada) in 1990 and was free to redistribute, with source code available from the author.

== Effects ==
When NightMare executes, it runs in the background. Every five minutes, it changes the entire screen of the computer for four fifths of a second to an image of a skull with blood on its teeth and a bullet hole with blood leaking out of it, and plays an echoing shriek on the audio channels.
