= EFront =

Affiliate marketing network

eFront
- Industry: Marketing
- Defunct: 2001
- Key people: Jain Shaileshkumar (CEO)
- Website: Archived at web.archive.org/web/*/http://www.efront.com

eFront was an affiliate marketing network which purchased successful websites, such as Penny Arcade, SquareGamer, and BetaNews, and pooled traffic to those sites to command higher prices for advertising during an industrywide ad revenue slowdown.

== Scandal ==
In 2001, there was a scandal when ICQ instant messaging logs between the CEO Sam P. Jain and other employees were leaked onto the internet through Fuckedcompany.com. The logs detailed activities such as not paying websites that had hosted their banner ads, sending legal threats to websites that spoke poorly of eFront, and threatening to "rape her and spit on her" (referring to a female webmaster angry about not receiving her check from the company). The logs also detailed how eFront attempted to hire, though never ended up paying, Something Awful founder and webmaster Richard "Lowtax" Kyanka, ostensibly to have him generate a positive buzz for the company.

Richard Kyanka stated during a presentation at the University of Illinois in October 2005 that he was still owed $40,000 by eFront, and that the company ran a number of competitions to attract clients, yet the prizes were awarded to employees.

As of July 2006, the company's former efront.com domain is owned by an unrelated French software firm, eFront Alternative Investment Solutions.
