= ShareWorld =

Amiga disk magazine

- ShareWorld #7
- Editor: Carl Read
- Categories: Computing
- Format: Disk magazine
- Publisher: CyberCraft; Dodo Publishing
- First issue: July 11, 1994; 32 years ago
- Final issue Number: August 18, 1999; 27 years ago 10
- Country: New Zealand
- Language: English
- Website: members.xoom.com/SWMagazine

ShareWorld Magazine was a disk magazine for the Amiga platform which was published between 1994 and 1999. Its focus was shareware and public-domain software, and it was particularly aimed at shareware developers.

Topics covered by the magazine included Amiga software development and publication, and product reviews, mainly of development tools, shareware products, or occasionally other disk magazines. It also featured general Amiga industry news, short fiction, and digital art.

== History ==
=== Amy PD ===
ShareWorld has its roots in Amy PD and Shareware Review, a disk magazine whose first issue was published by New Zealand based group CyberCraft in February 1993. The disk magazine was established to focus on public domain software, which received only limited coverage in mainstream Amiga magazines. A large amount of freeware and shareware software was available on the Amiga platform, of widely varying quality, and editor Carl Read sought to provide reviews which helped readers to sort the wheat from the chaff.

Amy PD was distributed as freeware on a single floppy disk, with an initially planned schedule of one issue per two months. It used Magnetic Pages V1.30, a shareware disk magazine software originally created by Mark Gladding for the NZ Amiga User Group monthly disk magazine "Amsmag." Although freely distributable, the magazine was produced with the intent of turning a profit, and subscriptions to the disk magazine were also sold at a rate of $18 NZD per three issues. At least one issue was also distributed as a subscriber bonus with Amiga Down Under magazine.

Amy PD ran for seven issues, with the final issue released in March 1994. Reasons for its closure included its failure to make a profit, and a mismatch between its intended and actual target audience: the magazine was most popular with shareware authors, rather than general users.

=== ShareWorld ===
Following the closure of Amy PD, CyberCraft launched a new, non-profit magazine: ShareWorld Magazine, subtitled "The international diskmag for Amiga shareware authors and the discerning user." The new diskmag focused on an audience of shareware authors, although it would ultimately incorporate articles on a variety of topics. The name was suggested by contributor Andrew Woods, in response to a call for suggestions in Amy PD #7.

Like its precursor, ShareWorld was scheduled to release one issue per two months, although issues often released late, a common problem in the disk magazine space. The magazine was distributed on floppy disk, with distributors in New Zealand and internationally exchanging the new issue for no more than a blank disk and postage. This non-profit approach was credited with encouraging contribution by volunteer reader submissions, who might otherwise have asked for payment.

From Issue #3, ShareWorld bumped up to two disks per issue. From Issue #8, the diskmagazine was distributed by Dodo Publications. The magazine's publication schedule became increasingly infrequent over time, and by 1997 was down to one issue per year, with news and readers' letters highlighting the major twists and turns of the Amiga platform during its decline.

Magnetic Pages V1.30 was used as the magazine's engine throughout its entire run. Various attempts were made to modernize the interface. A preview of Magnetic Pages V2 was covered, but never released. ShareWorld #6 introduced ShareWorld Sonic Interrogator, an accessory to extend the disk magazine's functonality, namely multiple songs and a feedback form. Both editor Carl Read and magazine contributor Rudy Sanchez separately began work on new disk engines, but neither was completed.

An official website for the magazine was launched on 22 September 1998.

=== Closure ===
ShareWorld ended with Issue #10, released on 18 August 1999. The reason for the magazine's closure was given as the amount of time taken to produce an issue using the Magnetic Pages software, although the downturn in the Amiga scene also reduced the magazine's subject. The final issue was reduced to only 1 disk, and did not include any music.

The ShareWorld website continued to post occasional Amiga news. All ten issues were uploaded there in both LHA and DMS format.

=== Issues ===
Issue	Format	Release
Amy PD #1	1 disk	Feb 1993
Amy PD #2	1 disk	Apr 1993
Amy PD #3	1 disk	May 1993
Amy PD #4	1 disk	Jul 1993
Amy PD #5	1 disk	Oct 1993
Amy PD #6	1 disk	Dec 1993
Amy PD #7	1 disk	Mar 1994
ShareWorld #1	1 disk	11 Jul 1994
ShareWorld #2	1 disk	16 Oct 1994
ShareWorld #3	2 disks	23 Jan 1995
ShareWorld #4	2 disks	2 May 1995
ShareWorld #5	2 disks	30 Aug 1995
ShareWorld #6	2 disks	9 Apr 1996
ShareWorld #7	2 disks	10 Oct 1996
ShareWorld #8	2 disks	25 May 1997
ShareWorld #9	2 disks	20 Apr 1998
ShareWorld #10	1 disk	18 Aug 1999

== Reception ==
Issue #6 was reviewed in the July 1996 issue of Amiga Shopper, rating it a respectable 89%. The reviewer found the Magnetic Pages software outdated, but praised the quality of content. Sister magazine Amiga Format presented a list of top-selling public domain releases from Roberta Smith DTP, which listed the issue as number 7 for the month.

Issue #8 was covered in Amiga Computing's September 1997 issue. The reviewer praised the magazine's presentation, calling it "definitely amongst the most polished diskmags I've had the pleasure of reading recently." Criticisms included the sporadic release schedule, a common problem in disk magazines, and the small number of reviews, although the length and depth of the reviews was praised, as were a variety of interesting articles and art pieces. CU Amiga also covered the issue that month, rating it 4 out of 5 stars. Roberta Smith DTP listed it as the top 5 selling public domain title of the month.

Issue #9 was reviewed in the July 1998 issue of CU Amiga. Reviewer Richard Drummond admitted to a dislike of disk magazines, and rated the issue only 3 stars out of 5. He also criticized the use of Magnetic Pages as technologically outdated, and a tendency to verbosity due to the lack of page constrants. Nevertheless, he rated it as good value for money. The same issue was reviewed in August 1998's Amiga Format, which mainly praised its reviews section, but criticized the amateurish feel.
