= Live Online Portal =

Windows-platform based Malware

Live Online Portal (LOP) is malware that is installed on Microsoft Windows.

Lop.com is a web site owned by C2Media LTD. It is a pay-per-click search portal where other websites will pay for each click to their sites via LOP. A method they used to get people to their site was to install a browser hijacker component on people's computers which would advertise their site through pop-ups. The installer could turn the user's web browser into a device with different links to lop.com.

Older variants of LOP were quite predictable and installed Browser Helper Objects and startup entries with known names. Some later LOP variants used a string of pseudo-random words as their executable names and have been placing these executables in the user's application data directory. For example, there are LOP variants which call their file "meal dog house bone.exe".
