= Gregor Freund =

American technology entrepreneur

- Current Company: Tumoni (2023-)
- Current Occupation: Co-Founder and Chief Architect
- Previous Companies: Versal (2012-2021), Check Point Software Technologies (2004-2005), Zone Labs (1987-2004), Starfish Software (1994-1997), Borland (1985-1988)

Gregor Freund is an American technologist and serial entrepreneur. He is noted for developing several patents including his personal firewall and consumer security technologies.

== Career ==
Freund's early career began as an employee for Borland International.

During his work for Borland, Freund was able to develop technologies including a data access system, which allows the sharing of files – regardless of the format of individual database files – without the need to make copies. Freund eventually became the company's principal software architect and was also credited for contributing in the company's expansion by founding Borland's first independent branches in Germany and Italy.

Freund left Borland and co-founded the startup Starfish Software with the previous Borland CEO, Philippe Kahn. At Starfish, Freund helped develop smart mobile devices. During this period, Freund was responsible for the company's technologies that powered the device synchronization in the wireless industry. Due to its patents, Starfish was later acquired by Motorola.

He then went on to work for Zone Labs (later ZoneAlarm). One of Zone Labs innovations that were developed by Freund was the TrueVector technology, which allows users to precisely monitor the activities of users in the Internet. For instance, one of its clients, Media Metrics, used the platform to track people to develop a database of information to determine patterns of Internet usage.

Freund was also behind several of Zone Labs’ technologies, including ZoneAlarm, the first personal firewall, and Integrity, an enterprise security solution. In 2005, Zone Labs also introduced what it claimed to be the world's first spyware solution based on next-generation firewall technology. Freund's use of the term "spyware" in a 2000 press release for ZoneAlarm Personal Firewall is said to have popularised it after its first recorded use in 1995. Freund later served as Chief Technology Officer at Check Point Software Technologies. He subsequently co-founded Versal, an education technology platform, and later co-founded Tumoni, where he serves as co-founder and chief architect.

== Patents ==
- System methodology for automatic local network discovery and firewall reconfiguration for mobile computing devices US 7222359
- System and methodology for providing community-based security policies US 7340770
- System and methodology for protecting new computers by applying a preconfigured security update policy US 7540013
- System and methodology for intrusion detection and prevention US 8074277
- Security system with methodology providing verified secured individual end points US 8136149
- System providing internet access management with router-based policy enforcement US 8200818
