= Pat Evans =

Pat Evans may refer to:

- Pat Evans (gymnast) (1926–2020), British Olympic gymnast
- Pat Evans (mayor) (born 1943), mayor of Plano, Texas, 2002–2009
- Pat Evans (motorcyclist) (1955–1977), American motorcycle racer
- Pat Evans (Louisiana), in the Louisiana Center for Women and Government Hall of Fame
- Pat Evans, American TV news anchor on KARE, Minneapolis, Minnesota
- Pat Evans (EastEnders), a fictional character

== See also ==
- Patrick Evans (disambiguation)
- Patricia Evans (disambiguation)
