= Patricia Evans =

Patricia Evans may refer to:

- Pat Butcher, née Patricia Evans, character in EastEnders
- Pat Evans (mayor), Patricia A. Evans
- Patricia Evans, candidate in Kettering local elections
- Patricia "Pat" Evans, bald African-American dancer and model featured on the covers of the Ohio Players album covers Pain, Pleasure, and Ecstasy
- Patricia Evans, producer on Bobtales
- Patricia Evans Mokolo, candidate in United States House of Representatives elections in Alabama, 2010

== See also ==
- Pat Evans (disambiguation)
