= Scareware =

Malware designed to elicit fear, shock, or anxiety

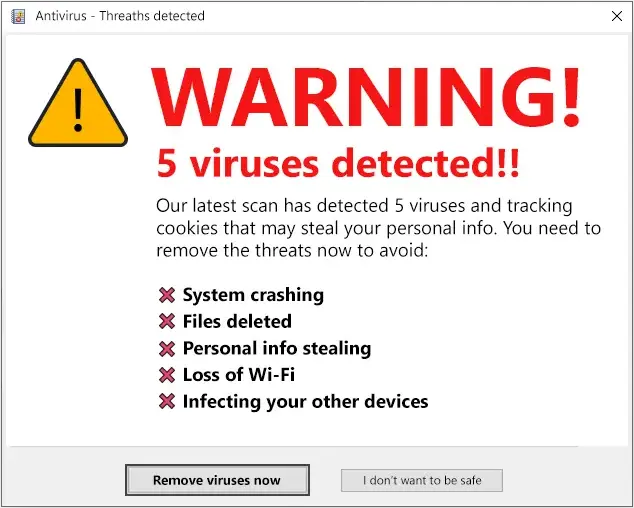
An example of a scareware popup

Scareware is a form of malware which uses social engineering to cause shock, anxiety, or the perception of a threat in order to manipulate users into buying unwanted software (or other products). Scareware is part of a class of malicious software that includes rogue security software, ransomware and other scam software that tricks users into believing their computer is infected with a virus, then suggests that they download and pay for fake antivirus software to remove it. Usually the virus is fictional and the software is non-functional or malware itself. According to the Anti-Phishing Working Group, the number of scareware packages in circulation rose from 2,850 to 9,287 in the second half of 2008. In the first half of 2009, the APWG identified a 585% increase in scareware programs.

The "scareware" label can also apply to any application or virus which pranks users with intent to cause anxiety or panic.

== Scam scareware ==
Internet security writers use the term "scareware" to describe software products that produce frivolous and alarming warnings or threat notices, most typically for fictitious or useless commercial firewall and registry cleaner software. This class of program tries to increase its perceived value by bombarding the user with constant warning messages that do not increase its effectiveness in any way. Software is packaged with a look and feel that mimics legitimate security software in order to deceive consumers.

Some websites display pop-up advertisement windows or banners with text such as: "Your computer may be infected with harmful spyware programs. Immediate removal may be required. To scan, click 'Yes' below." These websites can go as far as saying that a user's job, career, or marriage would be at risk. Products with advertisements such as these are often considered scareware. Serious scareware applications qualify as rogue software.

Some scareware is not affiliated with any other installed programs. A user can encounter a pop-up on a website indicating that their PC is infected. In some scenarios, it is possible to become infected with scareware even if the user attempts to cancel the notification. These popups are specially designed to look like they come from the user's operating system when they are actually a webpage.

A 2010 study by Google found 11,000 domains hosting fake anti-virus software, accounting for 50% of all malware delivered via internet advertising.

Starting on March 29, 2011, more than 1.5 million web sites around the world have been infected by the LizaMoon SQL injection attack spread by scareware.

Research by Google discovered that scareware was using some of its servers to check for internet connectivity. The data suggested that up to a million machines were infected with scareware. The company has placed a warning in the search results for users whose computers appear to be infected.

Another example of scareware is Smart Fortress. This site scares the victim into thinking they have many viruses on their computer and asks them to buy a professional service.

=== Spyware ===
Some forms of spyware also qualify as scareware because they change the user's desktop background, install icons in the computer's notification area (under Microsoft Windows), and claiming that some kind of spyware has infected the user's computer and that the scareware application will help to remove the infection. In some cases, scareware trojans have replaced the desktop of the victim with large, yellow text reading "Warning! You have spyware!" or a box containing similar text, and have even forced the screensaver to change to "bugs" crawling across the screen. Winwebsec is the term usually used to address the malware that attacks the users of Windows operating system and produces fake claims similar to that of genuine anti-malware software.

SpySheriff exemplifies spyware and scareware: it purports to remove spyware, but is actually a piece of spyware itself, often accompanying SmitFraud infections. Other antispyware scareware may be promoted using a phishing scam.

== Uninstallation of security software ==
Another approach is to trick users into uninstalling legitimate antivirus software, such as Microsoft Security Essentials, or disabling their firewall. Since antivirus programs typically include protection against being tampered with or disabled by other software, scareware may use social engineering to convince the user to disable programs which would otherwise prevent the malware from working.

== Legal action ==
In 2005, Microsoft and Washington state successfully sued Secure Computer (makers of Spyware Cleaner) for $1 million over charges of using scareware pop-ups. Washington's attorney general has also brought lawsuits against Securelink Networks, Softwareonline.com, High Falls Media, and the makers of Quick Shield.

In October 2008, Microsoft and the Washington attorney general filed a lawsuit against two Texas firms, Branch Software and Alpha Red, producers of the Registry Cleaner XP scareware. The lawsuit alleges that the company sent incessant pop-ups resembling system warnings to consumers' personal computers stating "CRITICAL ERROR MESSAGE! - REGISTRY DAMAGED AND CORRUPTED", before instructing users to visit a web site to download Registry Cleaner XP at a cost of $39.95.

On December 2, 2008, the U.S. Federal Trade Commission ("FTC") filed a Complaint in federal court against Innovative Marketing, Inc., ByteHosting Internet Services, LLC, as well as individuals Sam Jain, Daniel Sundin, James Reno, Marc D’Souza, and Kristy Ross. The Complaint also listed Maurice D’Souza as a Relief Defendant, alleged that he held proceeds of wrongful conduct but not accusing him of violating any law. The FTC alleged that the other Defendants violated the FTC Act by deceptively marketing software, including WinFixer, WinAntivirus, DriveCleaner, ErrorSafe, and XP Antivirus. According to the complaint, the Defendants falsely represented that scans of a consumer's computer showed that it had been compromised or infected and then offered to sell software to fix the alleged problems.

== Prank software ==
Another type of scareware involves software designed to literally scare the user through the use of unanticipated shocking images, sounds or video.

- An early program of this type is NightMare, a program distributed on the Fish Disks for the Amiga computer (Fish #448) in 1991. When NightMare executes, it lies dormant for an extended and random period of time, finally changing the entire screen of the computer to an image of a skull while playing a frightening shriek on the audio channels.
- Anxiety-based scareware puts users in situations where there are no positive outcomes. For example, a small program can present a dialog box saying "Erase everything on hard drive?" with two buttons, both labeled "OK". Regardless of which button is chosen, nothing is destroyed.
- This tactic was used in an advertisement campaign by Sir-Tech in 1997 to advertise Virus: The Game. When the file is run, a full screen representation of the desktop appears. The software then begins simulating deletion of the Windows folder. When this process is complete, a message is slowly typed on screen saying "Thank God this is only a game." A screen with the purchase information appears on screen and then returns to the desktop. No damage is done to the computer during the advertisement.

== Detection ==
Research in the 2020s has also introduced a new detection technology designed to identify scareware social engineering attacks with enhanced resilience. This approach targets the visual images presented to end users, which is a layer that attackers cannot easily obscure.

== See also ==
- Computer security
- Ransomware
- Rogue security software
- Tapsnake
