= Chargeware =

Type of mobile malware

Chargeware is a type of mobile malware that appears to be a legitimate mobile application but is designed to charge users for services without their explicit knowledge or consent.

== Characteristics and functionality ==
Chargeware primarily operates by misleading users into agreeing to unclear terms of service, leading to unauthorized fees and charges. It is often associated with Internet pornography, where third-party apps infect a user's device and covertly enroll them in expensive subscription services.

Chargeware frequently employs deceptive tactics, such as

- Hidden Fees: Users unknowingly consent to recurring charges when installing or using the app.
- Aggressive Subscription Models: The malware may subscribe users to premium services without a clear opt-out mechanism.
- Difficult Unsubscription Processes: The apps often make it intentionally difficult for users to cancel subscriptions.
- Exploit of Carrier Billing: Many chargeware applications take advantage of mobile carrier billing systems to levy charges directly on phone bills.

== Prevalence and impact ==
Chargeware infections have been widely reported in various countries. In 2013, hundreds of thousands of users in France and the UK were affected, with many cases leading to further malware infections. Other countries, such as Spain, saw chargeware infections at rates comparable to adware, while Japan reported the lowest incidence of such malware.

The widespread use of mobile devices has made chargeware an attractive tool for cybercriminals, who continue to refine their tactics to evade detection. Hackers now focus on exploiting loopholes in mobile operating systems and country-specific billing regulations to maximize profits while minimizing the risk of legal repercussions.

== See also ==
- Adware
- Ransomware
- Mobile security
- Internet fraud
