= Fred Fish =

U.S. computer programmer (1952–2007)

Fred N. Fish
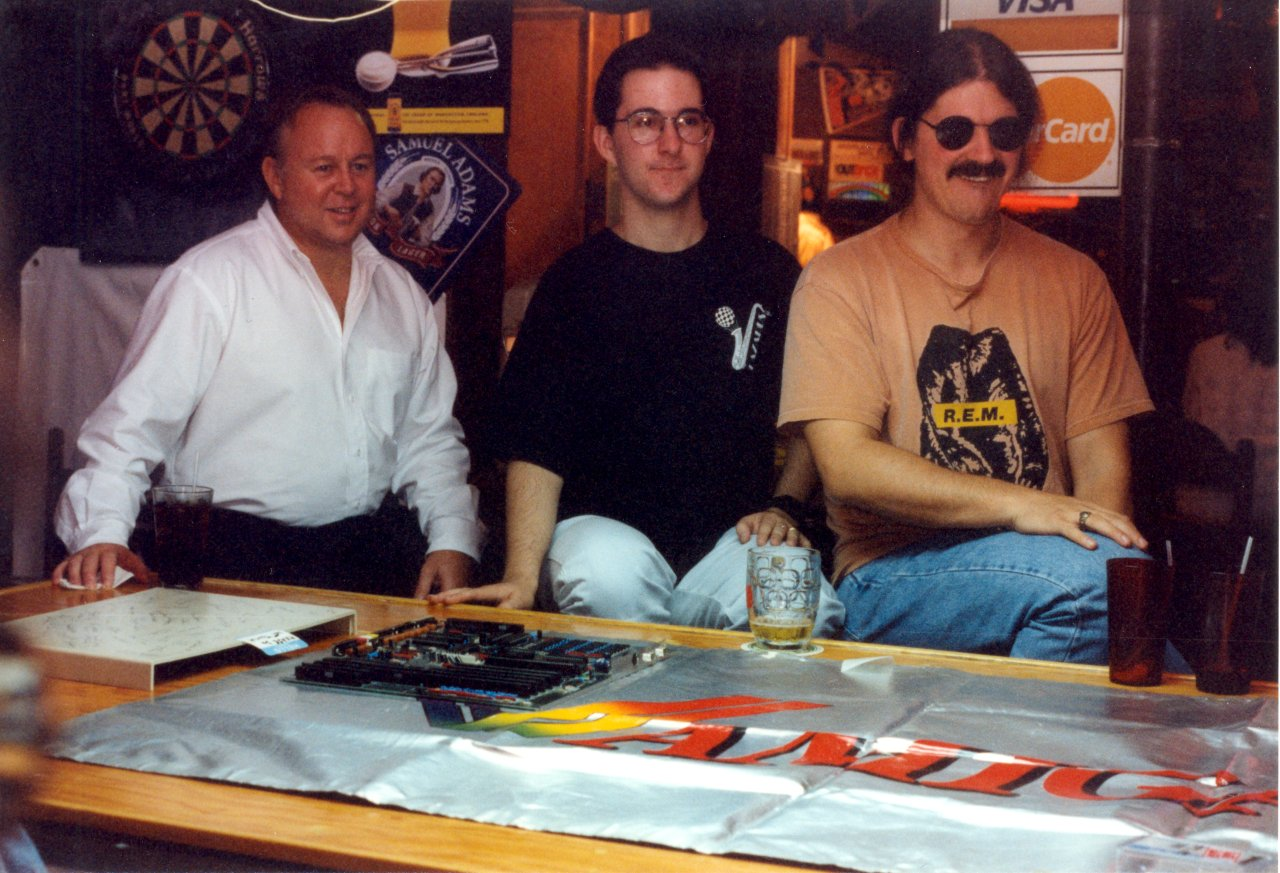
- Fred Fish, Jason Compton, and Dave Haynie in 1995
- Born: November 4, 1952
- Died: April 20, 2007 (aged 54)
- Known for: Fish Disks
- Spouse: Michelle Fish (née Norman)

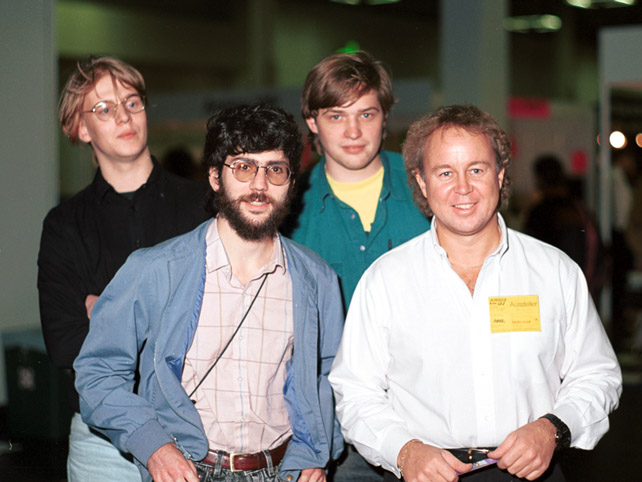
Image taken at the first Amiga show in Cologne (1989, Köln). Front row from left to right, Matt Dillon and Fred Fish. Back row from the left: Oliver Wagner and Mick Hohmann.

Fred Fish (November 4, 1952 – April 20, 2007) was a computer programmer. He worked on the GNU Debugger and distributed a series of freeware disks for the Amiga.

Fish worked for Cygnus Solutions in the 1990s before leaving for Be Inc. in 1998.

In 1978, he self-published User Survival Guide for TI-58/59 Master Library. It was advertised in enthusiast newsletters covering the TI-59 programmable calculator. Fish also initiated the "GeekGadgets" project, a GNU standard environment for AmigaOS and BeOS.

== Personal life ==
Fred Fish was married to Michelle Fish (née Norman) at the time of his death. He died of a heart attack at his home in Idaho on Friday, April 20, 2007.

== The Amiga Library Disks ==
The Amiga Library Disks – colloquially referred to as Fish Disks (a term coined by Perry Kivolowitz at a Jersey Amiga User Group meeting) – were widely distributed. Fish would distribute his disks for regional and local user group meetings, which in turn duplicated them for local distribution. Typically, only the cost of materials changed hands. The Fish Disk series ran from 1986 to 1994. In it, one can chart the growing sophistication of Amiga software and see the emergence of many software trends.

The custom fish-shaped icon used for the Amiga Library Disks from number 75 onwards.

The Fish Disks were distributed at computer stores and Amiga enthusiast clubs. Contributors submitted applications and source code and the best of these each month were assembled and released as a diskette. Since the Internet was not yet in popular usage outside military and university circles, this was a primary way for enthusiasts to share work and ideas.
