= List of portable software =

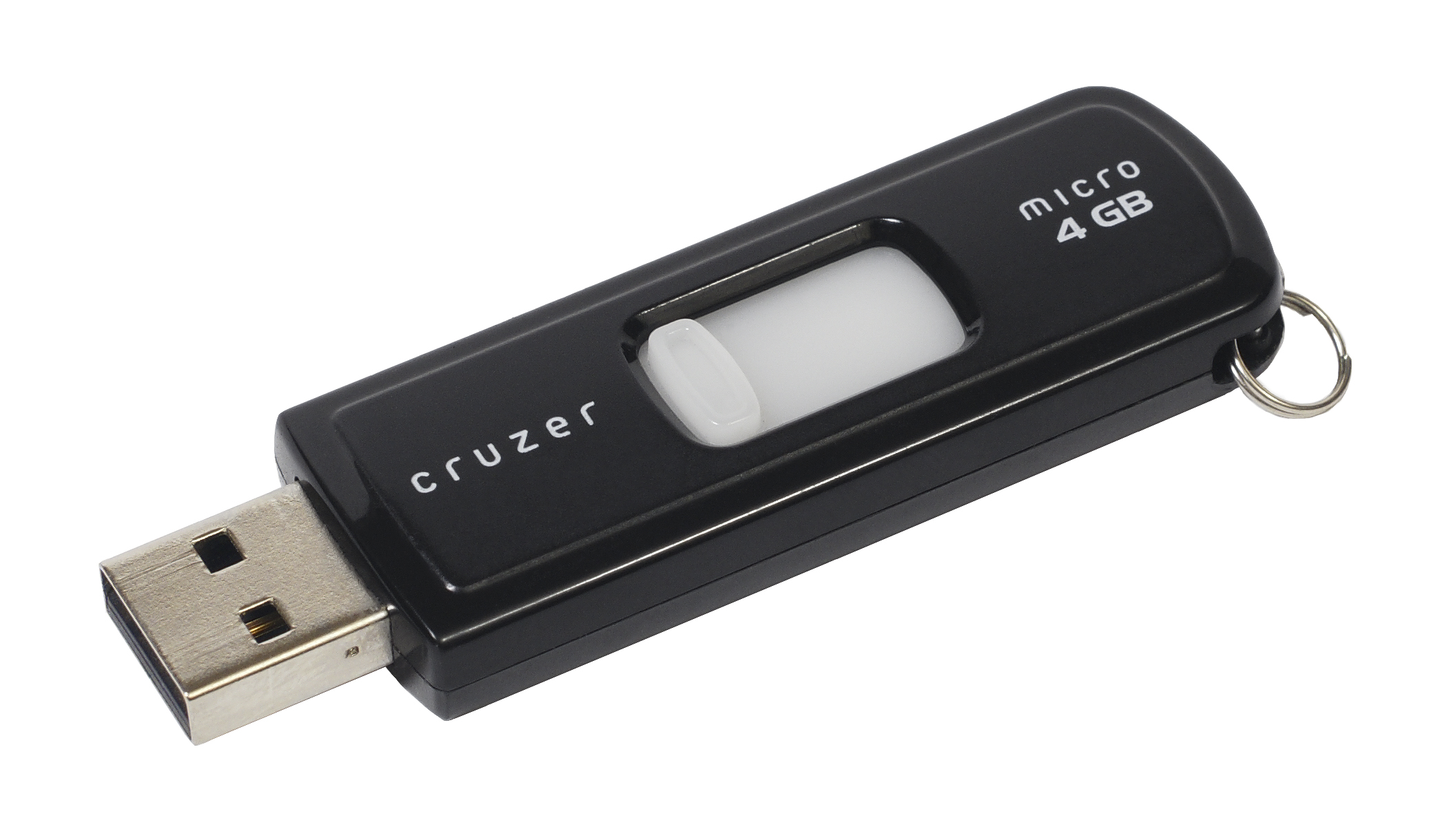
Example of a 4GB USB flash drive

For the purposes of this list, a portable application is software that can be used from portable storage devices such as USB flash drives, digital audio players, PDAs or external hard drives. To be considered for inclusion, an application must be executable on multiple computers from removable storage without installation, and without writing settings or data onto a computer's non-removable storage. This includes modified portable versions of non-portable applications.

== Bundles ==
- Ceedo
- MojoPac
- PortableApps.com
- U3
- WinPenPack

== Launchers ==
- Appetizer (Dock application)
- ASuite
- Launchy
- RocketDock

== Development ==
=== Scripting languages ===
- Portable Python
- Portable NSIS Version
- Portable AutoIt
- Portable AutoHotkey (zip file)
- Portable Perl (Strawberry Perl Portable Version)

=== Compilers ===
- MinGW
- Tiny C Compiler

=== IDEs ===
- Alice IDE
- Portable Eclipse
- Portable Code::Blocks (needs MinGW installed, which is portable too)
- Portable Dev-C++
- Hackety Hack, which is an educational version of Ruby
- SharpDevelop Portable
- VSCodium
- Visual Studio Code

=== Setup creators ===
- Nullsoft Scriptable Install System Portable (PortableApps.com format)

== Visual mapping/productivity tools ==
- XMIND

== Graphics ==
=== 3D modeling and rendering ===
- Anim8or – Free 3D modeling and animating software.
- Blender:
  - BlenderPortable
  - Blender Pocket
  - XBlender

=== Animation ===
- Anim8or
- Blender
- Pivot Stickfigure Animator

=== Graphic editors ===
- ArtRage
- Artweaver
- Dia
- EVE
- Fotografix
- GIMP:
  - GIMP Portable VS 2008 is the Gimp portable version of Gimp on Windows platforms (Windows XP, Vista, NT Server 2003, NT Server 2008)
  - Portable Gimp – for Mac OS X
  - X-Gimp
  - X-GimpShop
- Inkscape:
  - X-Inkscape
  - Portable Inkscape – for Mac OS X
- IrfanView
- Pixia
- Tux Paint

=== Icon editors ===
- @icon sushi
- GIMP – Supports reading and writing Windows ICO files.
- IcoFX
- IrfanView – Supports converting graphic file formats into Windows ICO files.

=== Viewers ===
- FastStone Image Viewer: supports screen capture, multiple pix into a single PDF
- Irfanview
- XnView

== Document-based ==
=== Office and publishing ===
- Abiword
- AllMyNotes Organizer
- Atlantis Word Processor
- Jarte
- LibreOffice
- OpenOffice.org
- Scribus
- StarOffice

=== Editors ===
- EmEditor Professional
- Geany
- Metapad
- Notepad++
- PSPad
- SciTE
- Sublime Text
- TED Notepad
- Textpad
- UltraEdit
- VEDIT
- Vim

=== Personal notes ===
- Personal Knowbase

== Educational ==
- Celestia
- GCompris
- Maxima
- Stellarium
- Calibre

== Games ==
- AssaultCube
- Cave Story
- Dwarf Fortress
- Doom I / II
- Frets on Fire
- Kerbal Space Program
- Minecraft
- PokerTH
- Quake
- Secret Maryo Chronicles
- Tile World
- Warzone 2100
- Xonotic

=== Emulators ===
- DOSBox – MS-DOS emulator
- FCE Ultra – Nintendo Entertainment System (NES) emulator
- MAME – Multiple Arcade Machine emulator:
  - MAMEUI32
- VisualBoyAdvance – Game Boy, Game Boy Color, and Game Boy Advance emulator
- ZSNES – Super NES emulator

=== Plug-in emulators ===
- JoyToKey – Gamepad emulator

== Internet ==
=== Web browsers ===
- Brave
- Chromium
- Falkon
- Firefox Portable
- Google Chrome Portable
- Links
- Maxthon Browser
- Mypal
- Opera
- Pale Moon
- Pocket K-Meleon
- Lynx
- QtWeb
- SeaMonkey
- SlimBrowser
- SRWare Iron Portable
- Sleipnir
- Waterfox
- XeroBank Browser

=== Email clients ===
- Mail – for Mac OS X
- Mozilla Thunderbird Portable
- Modest
- Pegasus Mail
- Pine
- Opera (has integrated Email client)
- SeaMonkey
- sylpheed (zip version)
- The Bat! Voyager

=== Instant messaging ===
- Adium – for Mac OS X
- aMSN
- Discord - via Portapps.io likely also available elsewhere
- Discord PTB - via Portapps.io likely also available elsewhere
- Caprine
- Element
- Google Talk
- Portable iChat – for Mac OS X
- Miranda NG
- Pidgin Portable (formerly Gaim Portable)
- Psi Portable
- Signal
- Skype
- Teamspeak
- Trillian Anywhere
- Rocket.chat
- Yahoo! Messenger

=== FTP clients ===
- WinSCP
- FileZilla
- Portable Cyberduck
- SmartFTP
- FlashFXP

=== Download managers ===
- Wget
- HTTrack
- Free Download Manager (installation required to create portable version)
- Opera (Integrated Download Manager)

=== P2P file sharing ===
- BitComet (needs msxml)
- Emule
- Opera (integrated torrent client)
- Transmission
- μTorrent (latest version)
- Halite
- FrostWire
- Limewire Portable
- qBittorrent Portable
- Vuze Portable

=== IRC ===
- ChatZilla Note: Requires a Mozilla based browser, e.g. SeaMonkey, or Firefox.
- Miranda NG
- mIRC Note: There is a U3 version of mIRC that can be installed on U3 drives. The original application is portable, leaving behind only the license key in the registry. (This may not be true with the newer versions that are Vista-compatible, as their default user data area was changed to the user's application data folder.) Since v3.1, it can be started from a command line using the -portable switch to use settings, DLLs, and license keys that are stored in the same folder as mirc.exe.
- Nettalk
- Pidgin (formerly Gaim)
- Opera (Integrated Irc client)
- HexChat
- Portable X-Chat Aqua – for Mac OS X

=== RSS, Atom readers ===
- RSSOwl (needs Java runtime environment)
- Opera (Integrated RSS/Atom client)

=== Telnet, SSH clients ===
- portaPuTTY
- WinSCP Portable Edition – SFTP/SCP/FTP client, remote file manager, GUI

=== Podcast managers ===
- Juice

=== Anonymity/Anti-censorship ===
- Tor Browser Bundle

=== Local wikis ===
- EverNote
- TiddlyWiki
- DokuWiki

== Miscellaneous ==
- Ahnenblatt multilingual Genealogy software
- Moka5 LivePC Engine (Portable VMware). Dynamically loads and unloads network drivers and requires administrator rights.
- Mojopac portable chopped down copy of windows. Requires administrator rights.

== Multimedia ==
=== File converters ===
- Any Video Converter
- Audiograbber
- CDex
- fre:ac
- Handbreak via portapps.io likely available elseware
- MediaCoder
- TMPGEnc

=== CD/DVD burning ===
- CDBurnerXP
- DVDStyler
- DeepBurner Portable Edition
- InfraRecorder
- Portable ImgBurn

=== Editors ===
- Portable Audacity – for Windows and Mac OS X
- mp3DirectCut
- GoldWave
- VirtualDub

=== Audio/MIDI sequencer ===
- Reaper has a .bat file for a USB stick installation

=== Players ===
- RealPlayer
- FLV player
- Media Player Classic
- foobar2000 – only supports xp and forward
- MPlayer
- SMPlayer (7zip version)
- Songbird
- K-Multimedia Player (zip version)
- The Core Pocket Media Player
- VLC Media Player
- Winamp

=== Recorders ===
- Streamripper

=== Video capture ===
- VirtualDub

=== Video repair ===
- Stellar Phoenix Video Repair

== Networking ==
=== HTTP servers ===
- Node.js
- XAMPP

=== Miscellaneous ===
- Netcat
- Proxomitron – Filtering Web Proxy
- Xming
- Wireshark

=== Remote desktop ===
- AnyDesk
- RealVNC
- TeamViewer
- TightVNC
- UltraVNC
- Parsec

== Other tools ==
=== Web editors ===
- Portable Nvu and KompoZer – for Mac OS X and Windows.
- OpenOffice.org Portable – Complete office suite, which includes HTML editor.
- SeaMonkey

=== Calendar management ===
- Portable Sunbird – for Mac OS X, and Windows
- Portable iCal – for Mac OS X

=== File management ===
- Directory Opus by selecting the USB/U3 export option
- Servant Salamander 1.52
- Total Commander
- X-file X-file for Windows 98SE/2K or later
- XYplorer

=== File archivers/extractors ===
- 7-Zip
- Filzip
- PeaZip, for BSD, Linux and Windows
- WinRAR, Portable version for Windows, still requires having a license for a regular version of WinRAR. The version number for WinRAR Unplugged is 3.8.0.1, while the latest WinRAR for Windows version is 4.11

== PDF tools ==
=== Readers ===
- Foxit Reader
- STDU Viewer
- Sumatra PDF
- PDF-XChange Viewer

=== Writers ===
- Portable OpenOffice.org – for Microsoft Windows and Mac OS X

== Security and encryption ==
=== Password management ===
- KeePass Portable
- Password Safe

=== Anti-spyware/malware ===
- Combofix
- HijackThis
- Spybot – Search & Destroy
- SUPERAntiSpyware

=== Antivirus ===
- ClamWin Portable
- GMER
- Sophos Anti Rootkit Tool

=== Steganography ===
- OpenPuff

=== Real-time disk/volume Encryption ===
- FreeOTFE / FreeOTFE Explorer

== System maintenance ==
=== Optimization and cleaning ===
- CCleaner

=== Storage management ===
Visual maps of free space and biggest files and folders on hard drive.

- WinDirStat
- Defraggler

=== System information ===
- CPU-Z – CPU and memory hardware details – clock and FSB speeds, SPD, OS version.
- AIDA32 – freeware system information, diagnostics, and auditing program
- Speccy – System information tool.

=== Partition/file recovery ===
- Stellar Phoenix Photo Recovery
- PhotoRec
- Stellar Phoenix Windows Data Recovery
- Stellar Phoenix Mac Data Recovery
- TestDisk
- Recuva – has U3 variant.

== See also ==
- Portable Application
- List of LiveDistros
- Live USB
- Portable application creators
- VMware ThinApp, a virtualization suite (with the ability to make portable programs)
- Windows To Go
