= Novell ZENworks Application VIrtualization =

Application virtualisation software

Novell ZENworks Application Virtualization is an application virtualization and portable application creation console by Novell that allows a user to build applications that run like an executable file.

This product is now known as Micro Focus Desktop Containers.

== History ==
ZENworks Application Virtualization was first made available on September 2, 2008. Since its initial release, it has undergone additional major releases, including versions 6.x, 7.x and the current version 8.x.

== Architecture & Technology ==
ZENworks Application Virtualization is an application virtualization solution that allows users to build highly portable virtual Windows applications that run like common executable files. Virtual applications are self-contained and include an isolated sandbox that interfaces with the operating system registry indirectly. Virtualized applications run without an agent/server architecture and without a local client install.

The technology also supports application streaming, a form of on-demand application distribution. This type of application streaming uses a predictive algorithm that maps common user behavior in applications to anticipate what portions of application code should be sent first, based upon changing user behavior, in an effort to improve performance.

== Building virtual applications ==
The process for creating a virtual application with ZENworks Application Virtualization follows one of three paths:

- Auto-configured applications: Use wizards to build pre-configured applications. Included applications are limited to popular or common applications.
- Snap-Shot: Take "snapshots" of an example system's state before and after the target application is installed.
- Manual configuration: Manually configure the registry, sandbox, and other portions of the target application. This approach typically requires an experienced programmer.

Users can then define other application behavior, such as setting an application to expire on a certain date, or to make the application run on a portable storage device (USB drive).

== Limitations ==
- Windows only applications: ZENworks Application Virtualization is limited to the Windows operating system for both building and running virtualized applications.
- Does not always fix compatibility: ZENworks Application Virtualization can address application compatibility problems in some cases, but should not be used as a primary means to solving operating system compatibility.

== See also ==
- Application Streaming
- Portable application creators
- VMware ThinApp
- Microsoft Application Virtualization
