= User environment management =

User environment management (also abbreviated to UEM) is the management of a computer user's experience within their desktop environment.

== The user environment ==
In a modern workplace, an organisation grants each user access to an operating system and the applications required for their role, applying corporate policy to ensure the user has appropriate access levels. This typically includes items such as the file systems, printers, and applications they should and shouldn't have access to. Within this framework, each user has a preferred way of operating, and they make several changes to enable them to work most efficiently. Common user changes include email signatures, language settings, and the environment's "look and feel."

The combination of corporate policy and user preference is described as the "user personality." Users develop an attachment to their PCs, although “their attachment is not to the device itself, but to the way in which they do their jobs today”.

Managing user personalization is a complex task that involves considering numerous factors and variables. As the desktop computing environment has evolved, the methods for delivering the desktop and applications have also expanded, adding to the complexity of managing the user's personality.

== History ==
The personal computer was originally introduced to the workplace as a standalone device. Over time, these devices were networked, and network-attached storage was introduced to enable the sharing of resources and information. Several advancements and new technologies from software companies have extended and improved this model. Citrix offers the ability to store the desktop environment centrally and publish it to remote users. Microsoft acquired some of this technology to develop their terminal server solution.

Virtualization is a technology that evolved from mainframe computer, initially into the x86 architecture servers, and now enables virtualized desktop environments. This advancement is largely driven by VMware and Citrix. A further technology, application streaming, offers an alternative method for delivering applications to users. Softricity was a leader in this technology before being purchased by Microsoft, who brought the solution to market as Microsoft Application Virtualization.

== The current environment ==
An IT administrator now has a variety of options when delivering a desktop and applications to a user; personal computer, virtual desktops, terminal servers, application virtualization, application streaming. Typically a combination of these is used to address all the requirements and constraints placed on an organization. Market analysts suggest that these technologies are complementary and will exist in tandem, rather than the newest technologies dominating. One growing segment of the market is the increase in provisioned and virtualized desktops, which can be managed centrally and address many of the limitations associated with distributed desktop computing. Several analysts have stated that the future of PC desktops will be heterogeneous (i.e. differing Windows desktop delivery methods will coexist). Key to this is how system administrators design the user experience, the closer the basic look and feel is to how users have previously interacted with their desktops, the more accepting of the new technology they will be. “The nature of pooling or sharing desktops means that each user does not always log on to the same virtual desktop each time they log in and as a result, organizations need to properly plan for this version of musical chairs. It is absolutely critical when using pooled virtual machines (sometimes called dynamic pools) that you have a method of deploying applications and settings to users that is fast, robust and automated.”. It is from this growing requirement that user environment management developed. Critical to the user environment is making sure that user profiles are portable in one manner or another from one session to the next.

== User environment management ==
User environment management is a software solution which enables corporate policy and user preference data, the ‘user personality’, to be abstracted from the delivered operating system and applications and centrally managed. This personality can then be associated with the variety of delivery mechanisms an organization uses ‘on-demand’, enabling dynamic personalization of provisioned desktops and easier migration of users to newer technologies such as virtual desktops. User environment management can be applied to all Citrix, VMware and Microsoft delivery methods, including virtual, provisioned, streamed and published environments.

Due to the extensive nature of user environment management, there are a number of solutions in the market which address only part of the solution such as Group Policy Preferences, and DesktopAuthority (Dell) for policy management. Tranxition Software offers migration of profile settings with data and profile policy control. A few companies offer a comprehensive and complete user environment management solution (i.e. the ability to control both profile settings and offer a portable user experience). These solutions work across multiple Windows workspaces including physical, virtual, and cloud environments. The advantage to cross environment support is having a singular User Environment that works across all of your Windows workspaces. This approach helps onboard users from one workspace to the next, some even across Windows OS version changes. Vendors that support this comprehensive User Environment view include Unisys, Ivanti and Liquidware Liquidware. It should also be noted that both VMware and Citrix have basic tools that are mainly available within their workspace offerings and are generally siloed for use only within those specific workspaces.
