= List of portable application creators =

Portable application creators allow the creation of portable applications (also called portable apps). They usually use application virtualization.

== Creators of independent portable ==
No agent or client is required for these (also called "agentless" solutions):

- Cameyo - Application Virtualization
- Ceedo (Discontinued)
- InstallFree Bridge (Doesn't appear available since acquisition by Watchdox in Dec 2012)
- LANDesk Application Virtualization (Discontinued? Doesn't appear in the article)
- PortableApps.com
- Turbo Studio (formerly: Spoon Studio and Xenocode Virtual Application Studio)
- VMware ThinApp (formerly: Thinstall)

== Related software ==
- AIX 6.1 Live Application Mobility
- Citrix XenApp
- Java Web Start
- AppImage (Linux)
- Microsoft App-V
- MojoPac
- Sandboxie
- Symantec Endpoint Virtualization Suite
- Systancia AppliDis
- Windows To Go

== See also ==
- Application directory
- Application streaming
- Application virtualization
- Comparison of application virtual machines
- Desktop virtualization
- Emulator
- Shim (computing)
- Software as a service
- U3
- Virtual application
- Workspace virtualization
- Low code
