= UEM =

UEM may refer to:

- Unified Endpoint Management
- University of Engineering & Management (UEM), Jaipur, India
- University of Engineering & Management (UEM), Kolkata, India
- User environment management
- Universidade Eduardo Mondlane in Mozambique
- Universidade Estadual de Maringá in Paraná State, Brazil
- Union Européenne de Motocyclisme, the European Motorcycle Union
- UEM Group, formerly United Engineers Malaysia Berhad
- Kolej Yayasan UEM, a college in Malaysia
