= RingCube vDesk =

- Developer(s): RingCube Technologies
- Initial release: September 9, 2008
- Stable release: 3.2.1 / February 28, 2011
- Operating system: Windows XP SP2, Windows Vista, Windows 7 and Above
- Type: Desktop virtualization
- License: Commercial, Proprietary
- Website: Official website (Archived)

RingCube vDesk is a Desktop virtualization product from RingCube Technologies. vDesk is a client virtualization or virtual workspace platform which virtualizes the entire desktop at an operating system level. The platform can be deployed in four different modes: on a local PC, on an external USB device, streamed across a network, or in conjunction with existing VDI solutions.

== See also ==
- Desktop virtualization
- MojoPac - Similar product also by RingCube Technologies
- Portable application creators
- Windows To Go
