= MojoPac =

Defunct application virtualization product

- Developer(s): RingCube Technologies
- Stable release: v2.0 / December 5, 2008; 16 years ago
- Operating system: Microsoft Windows XP
- Type: Workspace Virtualization
- Website: web.archive.org/web/20090903123255/http://www.mojopac.com/

MojoPac was an application virtualization product from RingCube Technologies. MojoPac turns any USB 2.0 storage device into a portable computing environment. The term "MojoPac" is used by the company to refer to the software application, the virtualized environment running inside this software, and the USB storage device that contains the software and relevant applications. MojoPac supports popular applications such as Firefox and Microsoft Office, and it is also high performance enough to run popular PC Games such as World of Warcraft, Minecraft and Half-Life 2.

The RingCube website is currently forwarded to Citrix, which has apparently purchased the company and discontinued MojoPac.

== Usage ==
To initially set up the MojoPac device, the user runs the installer and selects a USB device attached to the system. Once MojoPac is installed, it creates an executable in the root of that device along with an autorun file that gives the user the option of starting the MojoPac environment automatically when the device is plugged in (subject to how the host PC is configured). Once this application is started, a new Windows Desktop (with its own wallpaper, icons, shell, etc.) is started up in the virtualized MojoPac environment. Any application that runs inside this environment runs off the USB device without affecting the filesystem of the host. A user installs most applications (including Microsoft Office, Adobe Photoshop, Firefox) on the portable storage device by simply running the installer inside this environment. The user can switch between the host environment and the MojoPac environment by using the MojoBar at the top of the screen. Once the user is done with the applications, they exit MojoPac and eject the USB device.

To run the applications on a different computer, the user does not need to reinstall the application. The user can plug the portable storage device into any Windows XP computer. All the user's settings, applications, and documents function the same irrespective of which computer the portable storage device is connected to. The computer does not need any special applications or drivers installed to use MojoPac, although administrator rights are required if "MojoPac Usher" has not been installed on the host PC.

When the portable storage device is disconnected from the computer, there is no personal information left behind on the computer.

== Requirements ==
- Requires Windows XP Home or Pro; Windows 2000 is not supported, though Vista was planned to be supported in the near future (it never was).
- Requires Administrator access. A special version, MojoPac Usher, can be run in Universities or other locked down environments if the administrator is present to log in once. A Limited User version was under development.

== Security ==
MojoPac does not include features to encrypt the data on the USB drive, but does have a password protection system that prevents a person from starting up the MojoPac environment. All the files on the USB drive do not have any additional encryption, which is problematic if the MojoPac device is lost. However, this is no different from a default Windows XP installation and MojoPac can be used together with OTFE software such as FreeOTFE or TrueCrypt to provide any desired strong encryption and plausible deniability (just as Windows XP can). A MojoPac device secured using this type of software is reasonably safe in the case of theft.

Because of the virtualization performed by MojoPac, applications running inside the MojoPac environment cannot (generally) modify the host. For example, all the browsing history for Internet Explorer and other browsers is stored on the USB device rather than the host. Similarly, if a malicious program tries to delete the C:\Windows directory inside MojoPac, the files on the USB device are deleted, but the files on the host machine will remain. However, it is possible for a user to modify MojoPac's system files, which are then reflected to the same system files of the host PC, so the current level of isolation between the virtual environment and the host PC is not as strong as provided by full machine virtualization technologies like VMware. RingCube has stated this is a known bug which will be addressed in a future version of MojoPac.

== See also ==
- Comparison of application launchers
- vDesk - a similar product produced by RingCube
- Portable application creators
- Windows To Go
