= Firefox Portable =

Portable version of Mozilla Firefox browser

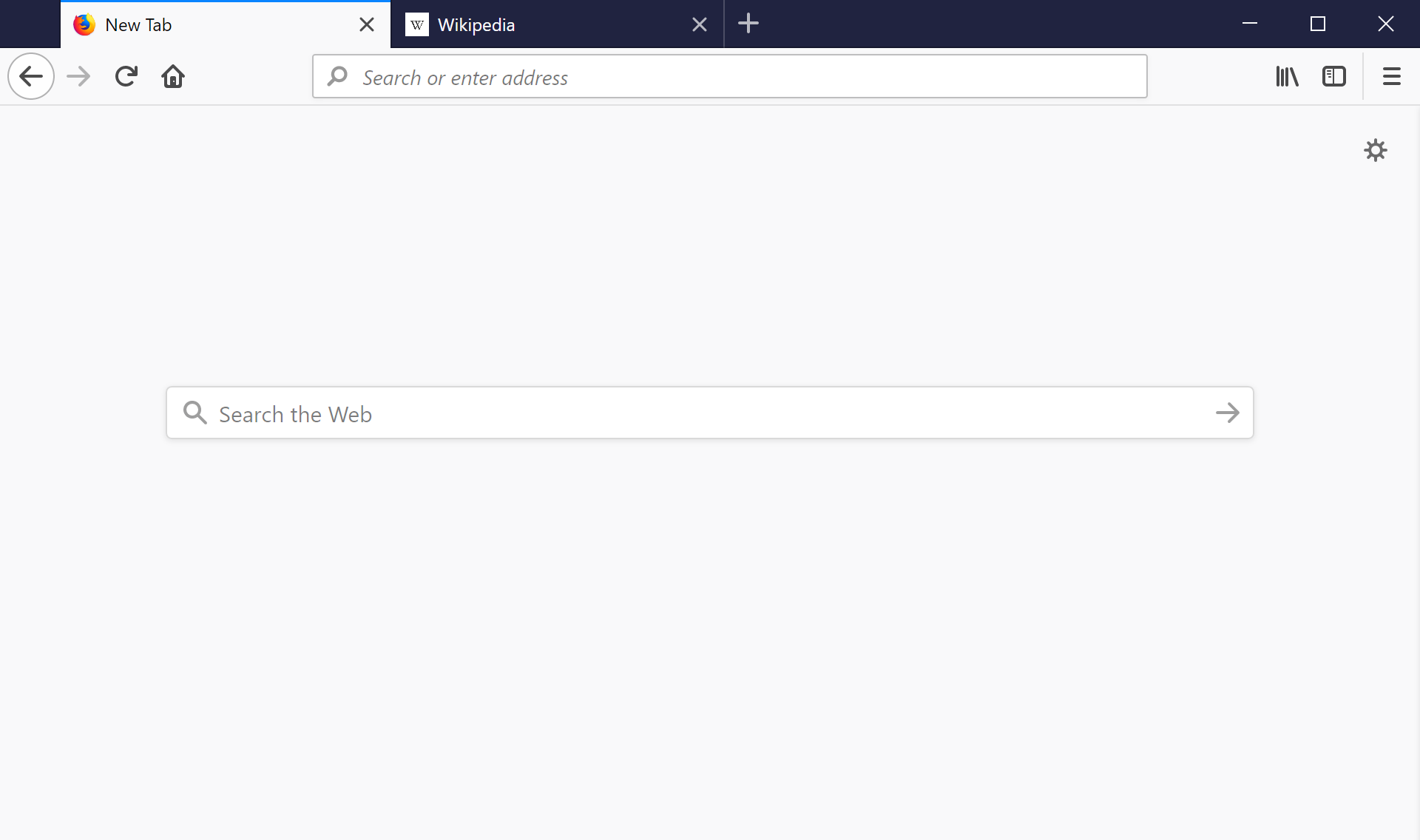
- Developer: PortableApps.com
- Initial release: April 16, 2004; 22 years ago
- Stable release: 138.0.4 / 18 May 2025; 11 months ago
- Operating system: Windows, Unix-based OS (eg. Linux and macOS) using Wine
- Type: Web browser
- License: MPL/GPL/LGPL
- Website: portableapps.com/apps/internet/firefox_portable

Mozilla Firefox, Portable Edition (formerly known as Portable Firefox and commonly known as Firefox Portable) is a repackaged version of Mozilla Firefox created by John T. Haller. The application allows Firefox to be run from a USB flash drive, CD-ROM, or other portable device on any Windows computer or Linux/Unix computer running Wine. The program does not require Firefox to be installed on the computer, nor does it leave personal information on the computer or interfere with any installed versions of Firefox, however, installation on the computer's data storage device is possible. The program is not totally portable; it cannot run multiple instances of Firefox out of the box.

It is compatible with Windows 7, Windows 8, Windows 10, Windows 11 as well as Wine on Unix-like systems. Although recent versions have serious compatibility issues with WinPE XP and BartPE XP, the old version 2.0.0.20 is compatible with Windows 98, Me, and PE XP and 2000.

== Differences from Mozilla Firefox ==
Firefox Portable retains all of Mozilla Firefox's abilities such as extensions and automatic updating. Modifications to reduce the number of writes to the flash drive have also been added. The web cache and browser history were previously disabled under the release of 2.0. Firefox Portable's ability to delete cookies and the download history on exit is not enabled by default, as per a licensing agreement with Mozilla.

Personal settings, bookmarks, and any installed extensions and themes are stored on the flash drive along with Firefox Portable. This allows the user to move from computer to computer without losing application settings. Plugins such as Flash Player and Shockwave Player cannot be installed to Portable Firefox in the usual sense, but the plug in files can be copied from a local installation to the appropriate portable folder.

== Features ==
- Launcher – Performs a number of functions including: adjustment of paths to external programs (mime types), adjustment of paths to local homepages, intelligent recreation of the component registry as you move drives, backup/restore of certain registry keys in certain instances, cleaning of folders and directories in certain instances, adjustment of some extension setting paths making non-portable extensions portable.
- Default Profile – A default profile exists within the Firefox directory with settings to improve portability.
- No Default Browser Check – Firefox won't check to see if it is the default browser on start up.
- Download Prompt – Firefox will ask where to save downloads.
- No Disk Cache – The browser disk cache has been disabled to decrease disk size and the number of writes to the disk, possibly increasing disk life.
- Update Prompt – As updating the browser on a flash drive can be very slow, Firefox Portable asks you if you'd like to update rather than doing it automatically.

== Issues ==
- Add-ons and extensions appear to take longer to install.
- Constant read-writes to an external flash drive may decrease the life expectancy of the drive.
- Multiple profiles are not supported (a somewhat hidden feature in the official Firefox); however, PortableApps.com released Multiple Profile Support for Firefox Portable.

== See also ==
- Mozilla Firefox
- PortableApps.com
- Portable application creators
- Waterfox
