= Invincea =

- Type: Subsidiary
- Founded: 2006; 20 years ago
- Founder: Anup K. Ghosh
- Defunct: April 16, 2018; 8 years ago
- Headquarters: Fairfax, United States
- Key people: Anup K. Ghosh (Founder & CEO); Dana Mariano (Chief Financial Officer); Norm Laudermilch (Chief Operations Officer); Alan Keister (VP Engineering)
- Services: Computer security
- Parent: Sophos
- Subsidiaries: Invincea Labs
- Website: invincea.com at the Wayback Machine (archived 2018-02-25)

Invincea, Inc. was a company that offered a suite of endpoint protection software products. Originally called Secure Command LLC, Invincea, Inc. was a venture-backed software company that provided malware threat detection, prevention, and analysis to stop advanced threats. It was acquired by Sophos in February 2017.

== History ==
The company was founded in 2006 by Dr. Anup Ghosh and was based in Fairfax, Virginia. Major investors included Dell Ventures, New Atlantic Ventures, Grotech Ventures, Aeris Capital, and Harbert Venture Partners.

In 2012, Invincea used a $21 million grant from DARPA to improve the security of the US military's Android-based devices such as tablet PCs and smartphones. The Invincea software secured data from unauthorized access and protect devices from malicious applications.

In June 2013, Dell announced an OEM partnership with Invincea and began shipping new endpoint security software dubbed "Dell Data Protection | Protected Workspace" on all of its commercial tablets and PCs worldwide. Dell Data Protection included Invincea container technology to put a shield - or virtualized container around each browser or application instance to protect it from the rest of the device and the network on which it resided.

In December 2013, Invincea acquired Sandboxie for an undisclosed amount. Sandboxie was a pioneer in the Windows Containment and sandboxing market, also called “container” technology, and the acquisition was made to consolidate Sandboxie and Invincea's own container solution.

In May 2016, Invincea launched X by Invincea. X by Invincea was a suite of products that protected endpoints by detecting and blocking known and unknown malware without signatures in real-time. X combined deep learning, an advanced form of machine learning, behavioral analysis and the legacy Invincea container technology, also known as isolation technology, in one lightweight agent.

In February 2017, Invincea was acquired by Sophos, a security software and hardware company. In August that year, the subsidiary Invincea Labs was renamed Two Six Labs.

In January 2018, Sophos announced that Invincea's deep learning technology would be integrated with the Sophos Intercept X endpoint security product. On April 16, 2018, Invincea announced the end of selling the X by Invincea suite of products. The Sophos products did not integrate with the Invincea container technology. Support and maintenance remained available under existing contracts through December 31, 2019, at which point, support and maintenance for Invincea products ceased. Sophos did not include the Invincea container technology in Intercept X. For that reason, Sandboxie was released as a free tool, and Sophos released its container technology to be open source.
