= Ahnenblatt =

Genealogy software application

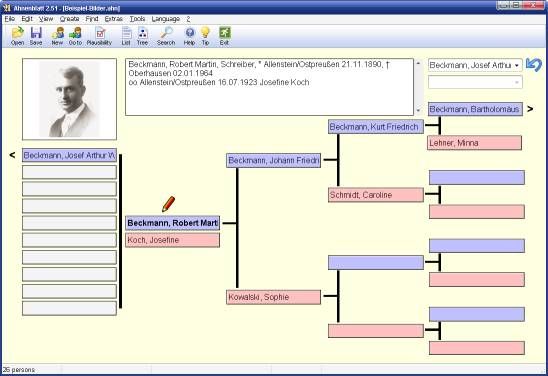
- Ahnenblatt Navigator
- Developer: Dirk Böttcher
- Release: 2001; 25 years ago
- Stable release: 4.17 / 20 October 2024; 20 months ago
- Platform: Windows
- Available in: 24 languages.
- List of languages Albanian, Croatian, Czech, Danish, Dutch, English, Espanol, Estonian, Finnish, French, German, Hungarian, Italian, Norwegian, Polish, Portuguese, Portuguese (Brazil), Romanian, Russian, Slovenian, Spanish, Swedish, Turkish, Ukrainian
- Type: Genealogy software
- License: Freeware and Commercial software
- Website: www.ahnenblatt.com

Ahnenblatt is a genealogy software application for Microsoft Windows developed by German programmer Dirk Böttcher. It features data entry, plausibility check and creation of charts and reports. The software imports and exports GEDCOM files and exports Web pages.

The name of the software is German and literally means "ancestor sheet".

== History ==
=== The Beginning (2001–2008) ===
Ahnenblatt started 2001 as a free software and was available on a webpage in German language only.

There are also portable versions to use Ahnenblatt from a USB stick.

=== Internationalization (2008–2019) ===
With release 2.50 Ahnenblatt began to be multi-lingual. Since then Ahnenblatt is available in 24 languages.

At the same time a branded free version of Ahnenblatt called "It's Our Tree Home Edition" was published for genealogy network verwandt.de by OSN GmbH. This branded version of Ahnenblatt was given up in 2010 when OSN was acquired by MyHeritage.

With version 2.99 Ahnenblatt integrated internet search at online genealogy platform MyHeritage.

=== Commercial (since 2019) ===
While free software Ahnenblatt 2.99 is still available, in March 2019 a commercial version 3 was released with extended data features

== See also ==
- List of portable software
