= InstallFree =

American software company

InstallFree Inc
- Industry: Software
- Founded: 2006
- Founders: Yoram Gabay, Netzer Shlomai
- Headquarters: Stamford, Connecticut, United States
- Key people: Yoram Gabay, CEO; Netzer Shlomai, CTO; Yuval Neeman Chairman of the Board.
- Products: Application Delivery Industry, Virtualization Software

InstallFree Inc. is a privately held company, backed by Ignition Partners and Trilogy Equity Partners, with headquarters in Stamford, CT and offices located worldwide. It was acquired by WatchDox (now part of BlackBerry). in December 2012. InstallFree specializes in Application Virtualization and delivery, based on their proprietary application virtualization technology that works on a variety of Microsoft Windows platforms such as Windows XP, Windows Vista, Windows 7, Windows Server 2003, Windows Server 2008, Terminal Server and Citrix XenApp.

== History ==
InstallFree was founded in early 2006 by Yori Gabay (now CEO) and Netzer Shlomai (now CTO), both former employees of Gteko Ltd, an automated support company acquired by Microsoft in November 2006 for $120 million. InstallFree launched its first product, Bridge Suite version 1.0, in April 2008, and issued its second release in September 2008 shortly after securing $8.5 million in financing led by Ignition Partners and Trilogy Equity Partners.

In December 2012, WatchDox (owned by BlackBerry) acquired InstallFree.

== Products ==
InstallFree Bridge is a clientless and serverless platform that allows the deployment of streaming or fully downloaded virtual applications over a variety of Windows-based platforms. It utilizes a virtual management console at the datacenter and a virtual agent at the end-point. The virtual agent, which runs on end-points without any installation process, assimilates at runtime InstallFree Virtual (IFV) Applications into their host environment's shell and binds them with other virtual and non-virtual applications, without using registry redirects and similar intrusive methods. InstallFree Bridge can be used from within a Domain as well as un-managed non-domain computers, and works agnostically with Windows XP, Windows Vista, Windows 7, Terminal Server and Citrix XenApp without re-packaging or configuring the application for each system.

InstallFree MiniBridge produces light weight executables, that upon activation bootstrap a virtual application by downloading/streaming all the components from a central location. The InstallFree MiniBridge executables can be distributed using existing Electronic Software Distribution (ESD) utilities such as Microsoft's System Center Configuration Manager and other MSI based software distribution platforms. InstallFree MiniBridge can be used only from within a Domain, eliminating piracy concerns associated with competing solutions. It works agonistically with Windows XP, Windows Vista, Windows 7, Terminal Server, Systancia AppliDis Fusion and Citrix XenApp without re-packaging or configuring the application for each system.

InstallFree Desktop is an entire virtual desktop that operates on top of an existing desktop operating system and works in complete separation from it. It does not require any installed components and does not use Virtual Machine-based technology.

== See also ==
- Application Virtualization
- Portable application creators
- Desktop Virtualization
- Service-oriented architecture
- Software as a service
