= WatchDox =

Acquired company

WatchDox LTD
- Formerly: Confidela
- Industry: Software
- Founded: 2008
- Founder: Noam Livnat, Moti Rafalin
- Fate: Acquired by BlackBerry Limited
- Headquarters: Palo Alto, California, United States
- Area served: Worldwide
- Products: Secure collaboration platform DRM File Sync and Share
- Revenue: $15 million (annual recurring revenue before acquisition)
- Number of employees: 100
- Parent: BlackBerry Limited (since April 2015)

WatchDox LTD (originally called Confidela) is a secure collaboration company which was founded by Noam Livnat and Moti Rafalin in 2008. WatchDox developed the first end-to-end DRM (Digital Rights Management) File Sync and Share platform.

In 2012 WatchDox acquired InstallFree as part of its strategy to provide a full suite of secure collaboration capabilities. The company grew to about 100 employees, and over 300 top enterprise customers, including Coca-Cola, Nike, Disney, Chevron, Zurich Insurance, KPMG, Bloomberg, Corning, Sony Comerica, Blackstone, TPG, MLB and others. Gartner consistently rated WatchDox as a visionary product in the EFSS (Enterprise File Sync and Share) market and in 2017 named it the best product of its kind in the "workforce productivity" and "protection" categories.

WatchDox grew to about $15 million in annual recurring revenue before it was acquired by BlackBerry Limited in April 2015. BlackBerry renamed the WatchDox product to BlackBerry Workspaces.

WatchDox was headquartered in Palo Alto, CA and its R&D center was located in Petah Tikva, Israel. After its acquisition by BlackBerry, WatchDox R&D center became BlackBerry's Israel R&D center (John Chen, BlackBerry's CEO, visited the WatchDox employees and the Israeli PM after the acquisition).
