= Utimaco =

German Cybersecurity Company

- Type: Private
- Industry: Cybersecurity; Compliance
- Founded: 1983
- Key people: Stefan Auerbach (CEO)
- Number of employees: 500+ (2024)
- Parent: SGT Capital Group
- Website: utimaco.com

Utimaco is a German technology company based in Aachen.

== History ==
=== 1983–1998: Early history ===
In 1983, Horst Görtz acquired the computer centre company Utilisation des Machines Comptables, and renamed it uti-maco software GmbH (an abbreviation of the original name).

In 1990, Utimaco moved from Frankfurt to Oberursel. One year later, Utimaco established its first subsidiary in the USA. In 1994, the company merged with the Austrian Safeware Ges.mbH in Linz and subsequently changed from a private company (GmbH) to a joint-stock corporation, the Utimaco Safeware AG.

Later that year, Utimaco took over the Dutch distributor D&R, which had been Utimaco's sales partner since 1988, and continued after the acquisition as a wholly owned subsidiary under the name Utimaco Safeware BV. Until 1998, further subsidiaries were founded in Austria and Belgium, France, Switzerland, United Kingdom, Norway, as well as in Sweden and Finland, and the US company Mergent International was acquired.

=== 1999–2010: IPO and acquisition through Sophos ===
Utimaco made its IPO in February 1999 as Utimaco Safeware AG at Neuer Markt, a segment of Deutsche Börse. Later that year, Utimaco took over the operating business of Kryptokom GmbH in Aachen.

In 2000, Utimaco introduced a card reader for online payments. In the same year, ACG and Utimaco founded the joint venture Omnikey AG. By 2000, the company's SafeGuard Easy software was used by companies and authorities like the Federal Bureau of Investigation (FBI), Deutsche Post AG and the Canada Customs and Revenue Agency, amongst others.

In 2001, Utimaco entered a partnership with Precise Biometrics, a European company in the field of biometrics. In 2002, the company was restructured. The business units Personal Device Security (PDS), Digital Transaction Security (DTS) and the system house for customer-specific security services — the core of former Kryptokom — were retained. The two business units Network Security and Security Modules were discontinued.

In 2008, Sophos announced to take over Utimaco through a voluntary public tender offering. By 2009, Sophos had acquired 92% of Utimaco's shares and subsequently established a profit and loss transfer and domination agreement. In 2012, Sophos conducted squeeze-out proceedings against the minority shareholders of Utimaco and delisted the company from the stock market. In the same year, the annual general meeting amended the Articles of Association and transferred the registered headquarters from Oberursel to Aachen.

=== 2011–present: LIMS misuse controversy and change of ownership ===
In 2011, Utimaco faced allegations of supplying Lawful Interception Management Systems (LIMS) to repressive regimes such as Iran and Syria, raising ethical concerns when their products were used by Iranian authorities to detain and torture a university student.

Following the controversy, in 2013 Sophos sold Utimaco to management and financial investors Pinova Capital GmbH (Munich) and BIP Capital Partners (Luxembourg), and since January 2017, the investment company EQT Partners has become an additional shareholder.

In 2014, Utimaco Safeware AG was dissolved, and in 2016, Utimaco Management GmbH was founded. Two years later, Utimaco acquired the US company Atalla and its product lines from Micro Focus International.

In February 2020, Utimaco announced the acquisition of Geobridge (Virginia, USA). In December 2020, Utimaco acquired UK-based MYHSM, a global provider of payment hardware security modules. In April 2021, Utimaco acquired exceet Secure Solutions GmbH, a provider of secure services for IT security and the Internet of Things (IoT). Furthermore, in May 2021, Utimaco acquired all shares in Realia Technologies, S.L. (Realsec), Madrid, Spain — a provider of hardware security modules — and the corresponding subsidiaries.

In August 2021, Utimaco was acquired by SGT Capital and finalised in early May 2022, after receiving all necessary clearances. Soon after, Utimaco acquired Celltick, a provider of public-warning and mass notification systems. In April 2023, Utimaco acquired conpal GmbH, a provider of IT security systems for protection of private data and authentication.

== Corporate structure ==
Since 2022, SGT Capital is the majority shareholder of the group and is complemented by the minority stake of Utimaco management, employees and EQT; alongside Bain Capital Credit and Tyrus Capital, as well as other institutional investors including Capital Dynamics, Commonfund, Flandrin Capital, University of Wisconsin Foundation, and UBS Global Wealth Management.

Utimaco Verwaltungs GmbH is the group's mother company, which holds liability for Utimaco Management GmbH. Utimaco Management GmbH is responsible for the operating business of the group, with all its subsidiaries. It is led by Stefan Auerbach (2019), Heino Erdmann (2025), Hacan Tiwemark (2022) and Cindy Provin (2024).

Revenue (in million EUR)
2017/18	2018/19	2019/20	2020/21	2021/22
34.8	44.4	66.1	83.2	100.4

Source: Bundesanzeiger, Unternehmensregister
