= VMware ThinApp =

Application virtualisation software

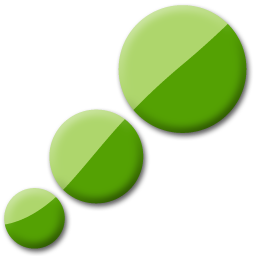
- Original author: Jitit Inc.
- Developer: VMware
- Stable release: 2212 / January 12, 2023; 3 years ago
- Operating system: Windows Vista and later Windows Server 2008 and later (previously Windows XP and Windows Server 2003)
- Size: 18 MB
- Type: Application virtualization Portable application creator
- License: Shareware
- Website: www.omnissa.com/products/thin-app/

VMware ThinApp (formerly Thinstall) is an application virtualization and portable application creator suite by VMware that can package conventional Windows applications into portable applications capable of running on another operating system. According to VMware, the product has a success rate of about 90–95% in packaging applications.

== History ==
ThinApp (previously known as Thinstall) was originally developed by Jitit Inc. and was acquired by VMware on January 15, 2008. VMware later used the code name VMware Project North Star while the product was in beta. On June 10, 2008, VMware announced that the final name for the product was going to be VMware ThinApp. The trial version of Thinstall was initially available only to corporations, then VMware offered a public trial version.

== Technology ==
VMware ThinApp provides application virtualization. ThinApp is able to execute applications without them being installed in the traditional sense by virtualizing resources such as environment variables, files and Windows Registry keys. The virtual environment shown to the client combines both physical and virtual resources, making it appear to the application as if it were fully installed and running. ThinApp does not have any pre-installed components and does not require the installation of device drivers allowing applications to run from USB flash drives or network shares without ever requiring Administrator rights. ThinApp converts standard application installers such as .msi files into self-contained EXE files, which includes everything required to run. Also it is able to scan a system before and after an application's installation and create a portable executable based upon changes made to the system's files and registry. Unlike self-extracting ZIP files, ThinApp does not extract files to disk or require system registry changes in order to run applications. ThinApp versions released after 5.2.3 drop support Windows XP and Windows Server 2003 and later.

== Editions ==
The most "basic" version of ThinApp is "VMware ThinApp Starter Edition", offered for free with any purchase of VMware Workstation, while the most "advanced" version is "VMware ThinApp Enterprise Edition", which adds support for AppSync updating, Active Directory integration and allows usage by multiple users (both for the ThinApp Packager and ThinApp Client).

== See also ==
- Microsoft App-V
- Turbo (software)
- Software appliance
- Windows To Go
- Sandboxie
- Portable application creators
