= Cameyo =

Windows application virtualization product

Cameyo, Inc.
- Legacy Application Modernization
- Native name: Cameyo
- Company type: Software as a service
- Industry: Technology
- Founder: Eyal Dotan
- Headquarters: Cary, North Carolina, United States
- Key people: Andrew Miller, CEO Eyal Dotan, Founder and CTO
- Products: Cameyo Cloud SaaS Cameyo Server Self Hosted Cameyo for Enterprise Cameyo for Independent Software Vendors Cameyo for Education
- Services: Cameyo modernizes Windows desktop applications by delivering them to any device on an HTML5 browser.
- Owner: Google
- Website: www.cameyo.com

Cameyo is an application virtualization product. It aims to virtualize Windows applications so that they can run on other machines or in HTML5 browsers. It is reported to be easy to use, light in weight, and compatible with a wide variety of applications. The company’s web site includes a library of ready-to-use virtualized free and open-source virtual applications which can be downloaded or run in the browser. Cameyo has a free edition for home and small businesses for up to 49 machines.

On June 5, 2024, Google acquired Cameyo to integrate Windows application virtualization support on ChromeOS for enterprise customers.

== History ==
The Cameyo application virtualization product was launched in 2010, and since then, has undergone at least two major and several minor versions yearly to improve the quality and functioning of the application. Cameyo claims to be one of the pioneers in linking app virtualization with cloud storage systems and HTML5. It has added new features recently, such as making it possible to run the applications on operating systems other than Windows, like Linux and Android. Since 2014, Cameyo has launched another angle to its operation: now it is possible to run virtualized Windows applications through the web browsers directly, with each application running in a new tab.

In 2023, Cameyo announced that its integration with Google's Chrome OS provided support Virtual App Delivery (VAD) services, allowing Windows applications to coexist with Chrome ones on Chromebooks.

In June 2024, Cameyo was acquired by Google.

== Operations ==
Once Cameyo has packaged an application, its output is a standalone EXE that contains the virtualization engine and the original software’s files and registry. It can then be directly run on target Windows machines. Since it is self-contained, it does not require an agent to be pre-installed on target machines. It can also be uploaded to a Cameyo server, making it possible to run virtual applications through a browser.

=== Virtualizing applications ===
Cameyo itself is a portable virtual application that does not need to be installed on the computer. It can be deleted once the virtualization is completed as a single file without leaving any traces in the registry. Cameyo essentially reduces all the files, folders, registry items, and binaries of the application that needs to be virtualized into a single executable file that can run without installation as a single file from any storage device on any computer. This single executable file can be carried in a USB device or be uploaded in a cloud storage system. This operation can be carried out either by downloading Cameyo on the computer, or through their online system by uploading the system file of the required application. However, it is advisable to download Cameyo on the computer as it provides for a better sequencing process. The following are the highlights of the procedure:

1. The application to be virtualized needs to be installed after opening Cameyo. If it is previously installed, it will have to be uninstalled and reinstalled once Cameyo is in capture mode.
2. Cameyo takes snapshots of the computer before and after the installation of the desired application, compares the changes in the two snapshots, and hence, captures the application as it makes changes to the registry and system files.
3. Both steps for taking snapshots requires some time, depending upon the speed of the computer, the size of the application, and the state of the registry of the computer
4. Cameyo makes it possible to virtualize multiple applications at the same time into one executable file
5. Close any background applications, and updating of windows and anti-virus programs, so that no extra material is captured by Cameyo, thus making the application bulky
6. Once the application is virtualized, it will be saved in the defined destination folder from where it can be accessed, opened, or copied in a portable storage device for use on other computers

There is also an option in Cameyo for editing virtualized applications in case any changes need to be made regarding the settings, name, or registry items of the application.

=== Running applications through browsers ===
Cameyo has recently made it possible to run virtualized applications directly through web browsers, hence, claiming to make software discovery and usage easier. Through this operation, there is no longer need to even carry the application, as it can be directly accessed from the website of the company. The company provides a large variety of open access free software and applications which are pre-virtualized for direct use. However, personal applications from the computer or the cloud storage device can also be uploaded onto the company server and accessed through the browser. Each application runs in a separate tab. As with virtualizing applications, browser applications now can also run on operating systems other than Windows. To use this function, create a free account with the company, and link the Dropbox or other cloud storage system with the account in order to access personal files from applications running in the browser.
