= Anim8or =

3D modeling program by R. Steven Glanville

- Anim8or screenshot
- Developer: R. Steven Glanville
- Release: July 20, 1999; 27 years ago
- Stable release: 1.0 / May 29, 2017; 9 years ago
- Operating system: Windows
- Type: 3D computer graphics
- License: Freeware
- Website: anim8or.com

Anim8or is a freeware OpenGL-based 3D modeling and animation program by R. Steven Glanville, a software engineer at NVidia. Currently at stable version 1.01.1402, it is a compact program with several tools which would normally be expected in high-end, paid software. To date, every version released has been under 3 MB, despite the fact that it does not make full use of Windows' native interface, carrying some graphical elements of its own. Although few official tutorials have been posted by the author, many other users have posted their own on sites such as YouTube and the anim8or home page. While Anim8or was once comparable to other freeware 3D animation software such as Blender, it has seen less progression in recent years, with Blender now being more capable than before.

== Development ==
On July 20, 1999, a message was posted to the newsgroup comp.graphics.packages.3dstudio, introducing the first version of Anim8or to the public. In its first week, the original version was downloaded almost 100 times. The next version, 0.2, was released on September 6, 1999, containing bug fixes and the ability to save images as JPEG files.

In the past few years, newer versions have been released, introducing features such as undo and redo commands, keyboard shortcuts, an improved renderer and morph targets. With each new version, the popularity of Anim8or has grown. It has been featured in several magazines including 3D User, Freelog, c't and the Lockergnome newsletter.

Anim8or's latest stable version, 1.0, was released to the public on May 29, 2017 and includes an updated user interface, more modeling and animation tools, and STL support for 3D printing.

Anim8or's mascot is a simple red robin, aptly named "Robin" which is the icon of the software and the character that most users learn to model and animate with Anim8or's "A Simple Walk" tutorial. Users are often also very familiar with the eggplant, a model first designed by Steven to demonstrate 3D printers at SIGGRAPH. It is likely the first model most Anim8or modelers have ever created, as it is taught in the introductory tutorial to demonstrate the basics of the modeler and the tools available.

== Layout ==
Anim8or's interface is separated into four sections, each with its own toolset:

- Object editor - individual objects are stored and edited within the object editor. Objects may be composed of primitives such as spheres, or more complex shapes made by extruding polygons along the z axis and adjusting the vertexes. Materials are then applied, per face if desired. The user also has the option to make morph targets for each object.
- Figure editor - in order to animate more complex models, they can be given a skeleton. Users can give each "bone" the ability to rotate on all 3 axes within certain limits and attach individual objects to each bone.
- Sequence editor - this is an extension of the figure editor, allowing the use of key frame animation to animate individual bones with a degree of accuracy of 0.1°.
- Scene editor - elements from the three other sections are imported and arranged in the scene editor. The key frames from the sequence editor can be modified, along with other variables, such as a figure's position in 3D space or the state of a morph target.

An image can be rendered in any of the four editors, but only in the scene editor can lights and other graphical elements be used.

The interface is a mixture of Windows' native interface, for such elements as the right-click context menu, and one specific to Anim8or, such as the graphical icons in the left-hand toolbar.

== Features ==
Although it is not as powerful as high-end commercial programs, it contains many features that are important to a 3D computer graphics package while remaining free. Such features include:

- 3D Modeler with primitives such as spheres, cubes, and cylinders
- Mesh modification and subdivision
- Splines, extrusions, lathing, modifiers, bevelling and warping
- TrueType font support allowing for 2D and 3D text
- The ability to import .3DS, .LWO and .OBJ files for modification
- The ability to export .3DS, .OBJ, .VTX and .C files for use in external programs
- Plug-in support, using the Anim8or Scripting Language, also known as ASL for short
- 3D object browser to allow the user to view 3D files in a specified directory
- Textures in .BMP, .GIF and .JPG formats
- Environment maps, bump maps, transparency, specularity amongst others
- Character editor with joints
- Morph targets
- Renderer supporting fog, infinite, local and spot lights, anti-aliasing, alpha channels and depth channels
- Printing directly from the program
- Volumetric Shadows as well as ray traced hard and soft shadows as well as ambient occlusion support.
- A plain text file format, allowing for the development of external tools such as Terranim8or
- Hierarchies

== System requirements ==
As far as multimedia standards go, Anim8or has very low system requirements. However, certain features, particularly shadows, anti-aliasing and Anim8or's resident ray tracer quickly become burdens on a computer's resources. While originally designed to work with Windows, users have reported running it successfully on Apple computers with Virtual PC and on Linux with WINE. This may be partially due to Anim8or's stand-alone design. This means that it can be pasted onto a USB memory stick or other removable media and run directly from it on any computer that meets the minimum specification. The minimum requirements are:

- 300 MHz Processor
- Windows 95 or higher
- OpenGL graphics card with full ICD support
- 64 MB of RAM (128 MB recommended, 256 MB with Windows XP)
- 5 MB of hard drive space (the application is less than 3 MB, but the manual and project/texture files can occupy several times this space).

== See also ==
- Baldi's Basics in Education and Learning, a game that uses Anim8or for its CGI elements, and has caused a recent resurgence in popularity of the program.
- Orbiter, a game that also uses Anim8or for the Spacecraft models and meshes, and was developed to simulate spaceflight using realistic Newtonian physics.
