= @icon sushi =

@icon sushi (aicon sushi is used when @ unsupported in a filename) is a conversion and creation computer icon freeware software tool for Microsoft Windows with support for Windows Vista. It has the ability to import icons from ICO, BMP, PNG, PSD, EXE, DLL and ICL formats and can export as ICO, BMP, PNG and ICL. This software is available in multiple languages including German.

== Reception ==
@icon sushi received mixed reviews. Softonic praises the application for its simplicity and support of XP and Vista icons, but noted that its feature set is too minimalistic. Likewise, ZDNet notes that the software lacks in features but that it is however user friendly. Clubic rated the application 3 out of 5, noting that it is portable and simple to use.

The Official Windows Magazine stated that @icon sushi is an alternative to leading commercial software such as Microangelo Toolset for creating detailed, high-resolution icons.

Citrix suggests use of @icon sushi to troubleshoot problems with icons in their software.

== See also ==
- List of icon software
