= Sandboxie =

Open-source sandboxing computer program

Sandboxie Plus (fork) (Note: Fork (software development))

- Sandboxie Plus running two sandboxes. ("DefaultBox" is running four apps: Dusk, Firefox, LibreOffice, and qBittorrent; while the "Safe" sandbox is inactive)
- Original author: Ronen Tzur
- Developer: David Xanatos
- Release: 26 June 2004; 22 years ago
- Stable release: Plus 1.17.3, Classic 5.72.3 / 29 March 2026; 6 months ago
- Written in: C, C++
- Operating system: Windows 7 and later
- Platform: IA-32, x86-64 and ARM64
- Size: 2.2–19.9 MB
- Available in: +18 languages
- Type: Security software
- License: Classic: GPL-3.0-or-later, Nagware; Plus: Custom-made, Open-core model, Nagware
- Website: sandboxie-plus.com
- Repository: github.com/sandboxie-plus/Sandboxie

Sandboxie is an open-source OS-level virtualization solution for Microsoft Windows. It is a sandboxing solution that creates an isolated operating environment in which applications can run without permanently modifying the local system. This virtual environment allows for controlled testing of untrusted programs and web surfing.

After various ownership transitions (Sophos acquired Invincea which acquired Sandboxie from the original author, Ronen Tzur), Sophos eventually dropped support and released the code as open-source. The day after the Sophos announcement, a third-party developer known as David Xanatos forked the open-source project and expanded it later with Sandboxie Plus.

== History ==
Sandboxie was initially released in 2004 as a tool for sandboxing Internet Explorer. Over time, the program was expanded to support other web browsers and eventually, arbitrary apps.

In December 2013, Invincea announced the acquisition of Sandboxie. The original developer Ronen Tzur further announced he would no longer be involved with the program.

In February 2017, Sophos announced the acquisition of Invincea. Invincea posted an assurance in Sandboxie's website that for the time being Sandboxie's development and support would continue as normal.

Version 4.02 introduced support for Windows 64-bit with the exception of Windows XP Professional x64 Edition, which was never supported.

Windows XP SP3 and Windows Vista SP2 were supported up to version 5.22, after which their support was dropped. In September 2019, Sandboxie version 5.31.4 was released under a freeware license "with plans to transition it to an open source tool". The previous commercial license still applied to customers with active licenses until their license expired.

=== Downtime ===
In April 2019, the official site was shut down, preventing downloads, installations and purchases, which prompted the creation of a temporary forum in the company's own domain.

In May 2019, the official site returned with the original forums permanently shut down in favor of Sophos' own forums, which were later shut down as well. Between May and September 2019 (when Sandboxie became freeware), the purchase options were still missing.

In response to the announcement of the closure of the Sandboxie website, software developer David Berdik scraped the site's contents and published the archive on GitHub on May 10, 2020.

=== Open-source ===
In April 2020, Sophos released the source code (as the source code-only version 5.40) under the GPL 3.0+ license. Sophos stated that they would no longer be involved in the development of Sandboxie and that the open-source community would have to continue development instead.

=== Sandboxie Plus (fork) ===
Sandboxie Plus is a fork of the original open-source code and provides two editions of Sandboxie: Plus and Classic.

Sandboxie Plus has been in development since early 2020, while the first stable version was made available on 25 December 2021. It includes numerous improvements:

- ability for more granular access control rules
- privacy mode sandboxes that protect user data from illegitimate access
- app compartment mode that provides less isolation but higher compatibility
- per-sandbox network firewall based on Windows Filtering Platform
- modern Qt-based UI with dark mode and built-in support for many advanced options
- per-sandbox snapshots
- a hardened lockdown mode
- support for ARM64-based platforms (starting with v1.5.0)

Although the Classic edition lacks native interface support for Plus features, both editions offer the same security and compatibility fixes. While they remain free for private non-commercial use, a few of the newly developed features are only available to project supporters with a valid "supporter certificate".

Until version 0.4.5, antivirus software, including Microsoft Defender Antivirus, falsely flagged Sandboxie Plus. To clear this false flag, the Sandboxie Plus developer had to pay Microsoft for a digital certificate, which he raised thanks to donors on Patreon. Version 0.5.0 was the first digitally signed version of Sandboxie Plus. An exception exists for the pre-release versions, (Note: Technical Preview) which are usually not signed to speed up the release process.

== Reception ==
Sandboxie was included in Brothersoft's 2010 Editors Pick list. In November 2011, Gizmo's Freeware gave Sandboxie a rating of 9 out of 10 stars and included it in their Editors' Choice List as the "Best Free Browser Protection Utility". Softonic has given Sandboxie a rating of 8 out of 10 with Elena Santos stating in her review that "Sandboxie is a handy tool to test untrustworthy software without putting your system in danger."

== See also ==
- Google Native Client (discontinued)
- iCore Virtual Accounts (discontinued)
- Windows SteadyState (discontinued)
