= Celltick Technologies =

US based telecom technology provider

- Company type: Privately held company
- Industry: Telecommunications
- Founded: 2000
- Founders: Ronen Daniel, Uri Baron, and brothers Ran and Yossi Wellingstein
- Defunct: April 21, 2022
- Fate: Acquired
- Successor: Utimaco
- Headquarters: New York, United States of America
- Area served: Worldwide
- Key people: Jan Frykhammar (Chairman); Ronen Daniel (Co-Founder & CEO)
- Products: MAGEN (Mass Alert Geo Emergency Notifications) Suite of Products
- Owner: Utimaco
- Number of employees: 79 (2022)
- Website: www.celltick.com

Celltick Technologies was an American telecom technology company specializing in emergency population warning systems, cell broadcasting and mass notification platforms. The company was acquired by Utimaco in 2022.

The company was also known for creating software applications which were used by mobile carriers, original equipment manufacturers (OEMs) and governmental organizations.

== History ==
The company was founded in 2000 by co-founder Ronen Daniel. In 2005, the company raised $11 million from Amadeus Capital Partners and Jerusalem Venture Partners to expand in western Europe.

During 2002, in pre-android era, Celltick released its first product – software named as LiveScreen, for mobile operators. The aim was to deliver mobile contents and services directly to the handset of the consumers.

The software was later extended on the symbian os, for the handsets manufactured by Nokia. The software had an applet embedded within the SIM card.

LiveScreen was used by multiple mobile operators worldwide including BSNL, Airtel, Tele2, Vodafone, and Taiwan Mobile, Globe Telcom Philippines.

In 2013, Celltick released the Start interface for android based handsets, which was utilized by multiple mobile operators and device manufacturers reaching around 150 million installations.

In 2019, the Start division was acquired by Taboola.

In January 2021, Frykhammar, former CFO and CEO of Ericsson joined Celltick as chairman of the board. Subsequently, Celltick became known for providing services to mobile operators and governments in Europe to meet the requirements of Article 110 in the legislation of the European Electronic Communications Code, mandating all member states to deploy a mobile public warning system by June 2022.

In April 2022, the company was acquired by German-based cybersecurity firm Utimaco to expand its services to include public-warning and mass notification systems.
