= Stellar Data Recovery =

- Developer: Stellar
- Initial release: 14 April 2000; 26 years ago
- Stable release: 12.3.0.2 / 10 September 2025; 8 months ago
- Operating system: Microsoft Windows, macOS, iOS, Android (operating system)
- Type: Utility software
- License: Freemium
- Website: https://www.stellarinfo.com/

Stellar Data Recovery is a commercial data recovery software suite developed by Stellar for Windows, macOS, iOS and Android devices. The software restores deleted, corrupted or inaccessible data from hard drives, SSDs, USB drives, memory cards and mobile devices. It is available in multiple editions offering features such as deep scan, partition recovery, video repair and RAID recovery.

== History ==
Stellar introduced the product in the early 2000s under the name Stellar Phoenix. Earlier Windows versions were marketed as Stellar Phoenix Windows Data Recovery, while macOS editions were known as Stellar Phoenix Mac Data Recovery. These product lines were later rebranded as Stellar Data Recovery for Windows and Stellar Data Recovery for Mac to modernize the product identity.

== Features ==
The software supports the recovery of documents, photos, videos, emails and other file types from formatted, deleted or corrupted storage volumes. Higher-tier editions include features such as corrupted video repair and advanced RAID reconstruction.

== Reception ==
Several independent technology publications have reviewed Stellar Data Recovery across different platforms and product generations.

- TechRadar described it as fast and highly customizable, noting its wide applicability for various data-loss scenarios.
- Forbes highlighted it as one of the best data recovery tools for handling large volumes of files.
- Digital Trends reviewed the Premium version, praising its usability and advanced recovery capabilities.
- MacWorld rated the macOS version positively for its interface and recovery performance.
- PCMag and CNET reviewed earlier versions during the Stellar Phoenix era, noting their performance and evolution over time.

== Platforms ==
=== Windows ===
The Windows edition includes quick and deep scan capabilities, support for NTFS, FAT, exFAT and ReFS file systems, and tools for recovering lost partitions and external drives.

=== macOS ===
The macOS edition supports APFS, HFS+, HFS and exFAT file systems and includes features designed for Mac users, such as photo and video recovery from Time Machine disks.

== See also ==
- List of data recovery software
- List of data-erasing software
