= PortableApps.com =

Website offering Windows apps packaged for portability

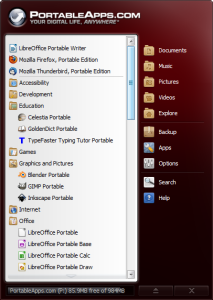
- PortableApps.com Platform menu
- Original author(s): John T. Haller
- Developer(s): Rare Ideas, LLC
- Initial release: November 20, 2006; 18 years ago
- Stable release: 26.3 / November 03, 2023
- Operating system: Microsoft Windows
- Size: 17 MB
- License: GPLv2, LGPLv2, MIT License, MPL 1.1, wxWindows Library Licence
- Website: portableapps.com

PortableApps.com is a website that distributes free applications for Windows that have been packaged for portability. These portable applications are intended to be used from removable storage devices such as USB flash drives.

The site was founded by John T. Haller and includes contributions from over 100 people, including developers, designers, and translators.

== History ==
PortableApps.com started out as a Haller's personal website hosting a portable version of Mozilla Firefox in March 2004. He then expanded the project to include Mozilla Thunderbird and OpenOffice.org. The open-source group of portable programs outgrew his personal website and he moved it to a community site, PortableApps.com. The site currently hosts various projects created by forum members, and is also used for bug reporting and suggestions. Some PortableApps distributions are hosted on SourceForge.

== Format ==
Application installers designed for use with the PortableApps.com menu follow the convention of using filenames ending in a paf.exe extension, include HTML documentation, and store data in the Data directory. Installers intended for use with the PortableApps.com menu can be either NSIS installers that are generated with the PortableApps.com Installer, compressed archives with self extractors, or a custom Windows executable.

The majority of applications can run on most computers with Windows 2000 or later. Many apps will also run under Wine on Unix-like operating systems. Older versions of many apps support Windows 95/98/Me, but no new releases support these systems.

== PortableApps.com Launcher ==
The PortableApps.com Launcher (also known as PAL) is used to make applications portable by handling path redirection, environment variable changes, file and directory movement, configuration file path updates. and similar changes, as configured. The PortableApps.com Launcher allows software to be made portable without any modification. All modern apps use PAL and the installers are made using the Nullsoft Scriptable Install System. In 2024, the ability to target apps by license type was added to the PortableApps.com Launcher.

== See also ==
- Portable application
- List of portable software
- List of portable application creators
- Comparison of desktop application launchers
