= Stellar Photo Recovery =

- Developer(s): Stellar
- Initial release: 14 March 2002; 23 years ago
- Stable release: 10.0 / 25 February 2020; 5 years ago
- Operating system: Mac / Windows
- Type: Utility software
- License: Shareware
- Website: https://www.stellarinfo.com/photo-recovery-software.php

Stellar Photo Recovery, previously known as Stellar Phoenix Photo Recovery, is a multimedia files recovery utility for both Windows and Mac based computers and is developed by Stellar.
