= Turbo (software) =

Family of software products

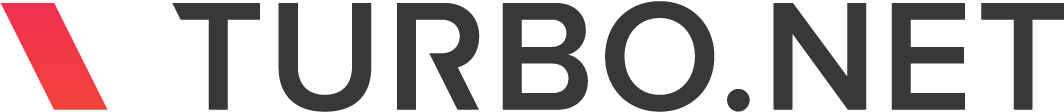
- Logo of the company. Although it reads "turbo.net", the company uses it to represent itself and its products as well.
- Formerly: Spoon; Xenocode
- Type: Private
- Industry: Computer software
- Founder: Kenji Obata
- Headquarters: Seattle, WA
- Number of employees: 25

Turbo (formerly Spoon and Xenocode) is a set of software products and services developed by the Code Systems Corporation for application virtualization, portable application creation, and digital distribution. Code Systems Corporation is an American corporation headquartered in Seattle, Washington, and is best known for its Turbo products that include Browser Sandbox, Turbo Studio, TurboServer, and Turbo.

Kenji C. Obata founded Code Systems Corporation in 2006 and introduced Turbo’s precursor, Xenocode. Xenocode was an early application virtualization engine for the Windows platform. Obata was the CEO of the corporation, which had become commonly known as Spoon since a rebranding in 2010. Turbo’s tools package conventional software applications for Microsoft Windows in a portable application format that can be delivered via a single executable or streamed over the web. Files and settings automatically synchronize across devices via Turbo’s patented virtualization technology which allows access to local files and printers from web-based applications.

== About the company ==
CEO Obata graduated from Yale University in 1999 and spent several years as a development lead at Microsoft Corporation before attending the University of California, Berkeley to obtain his Ph.D. in Computer Science. He returned to Seattle in 2006 to grow the company. From 2006 to 2009, Code Systems Corporation developed Xenocode, one of the first application virtualization engines for the Windows platform. The product focused on application deployment via preconfigured executables. Spoon was launched in 2010 as a reintroduction of Xenocode’s virtualization engines. Turbo’s technology combines application and storage virtualization with web-based network and synchronization protocols, machine learning algorithms, and semistructured large data storage systems. Turbo.net virtual applications run in isolated sandboxes

Products include web development and testing tools such as Browser Sandbox, Browser Studio.Free accounts allow users to stream hundreds of brand-name applications like Skype, Chrome, and Firefox without installing them. All accounts also come with cloud storage hosted on Turbo.net. Turbo is headquartered in Seattle and employee-owned.

== Turbo.net ==
Turbo.net
- Website type: Digital Distribution, Cloud computing
- Available in: English

Turbo.net, the official website of Turbo, hosts applications that can be launched via the web with no installation. Turbo’s application library includes popular software like Chrome, Skype, VLC Media Player, SketchUp, and hundreds of other top free and open-source applications. Turbo works through a small browser plugin with no administrative privileges or drivers required.

The introduction of Turbo, which combines Selenium, transfers the Turbo Virtual Machine (SVM) as a lightweight implementation of core operating system APIs, including the filesystem, registry, process, and threading subsystems. they're within the Windows user-mode space. Applications executing within the Turbo virtual environment interact with a virtualized filesystem, registry, and process environment, rather than directly with the host device operating system. The virtualization engine handles requests within the virtualized environment internally or, when appropriate, routes requests to the host device filesystem and registry, possibly redirecting or overriding requests as determined by the virtual application configuration.

=== Cross-browser testing - Browser Sandbox ===
Turbo.net hosts browsersandbox.com, which allows users to run multiple versions of browsers such as Internet Explorer, Google Chrome, Mozilla Firefox, Opera, and mobile browsers on a single machine. Web developers can use Browser Sandbox for cross-browser testing to ensure websites function correctly in multiple versions of popular browsers. Virtualized browsers behave exactly like installed browsers, and because they run locally, web applications tests can be hosted on the user’s own development machine or on internal servers. Turbo.net supports standard browser components like Java applets and ActiveX controls as well as popular browser plugins like Firebug, IE Developer Toolbar, and CSS and JavaScript debugging consoles.

=== App Library ===
Similar to their Browser Sandbox, Turbo hosts an application library filled with hundreds of free and open-source applications that Turbo streams to end users. The app library is part of Turbo’s free basic account and allows users to stream and use full desktop applications like Skype, Google Chrome, VLC media player, Sublime Text, Notepad++, and GIMP without installing them.

Turbo virtual applications do not need to be accessed through a browser. Users with Turbo’s plugin can press [Alt+Win] to bring up the Spoon Console, which acts as an alternate Start menu that can launch both local and virtualized applications and files. They claim that running these applications in virtual sandboxes is faster, safer, and more portable than installing them locally.

== Software ==
=== Turbo Studio ===
Turbo Studio
- Other names: Spoon Studio; Xenocode Virtual Application Studio
- Developer: Code Systems Corporation
- Stable release: 17.7.987.23 / February 9, 2018; 8 years ago
- Operating system: Microsoft Windows
- Available in: English
- Type: Portable application creators, application virtualization, containerization
- License: Trialware with no advance expiry warning
- Website: turbo.net/studio

Turbo Studio (formerly Spoon Studio and Xenocode Virtual Application Studio) is an application virtualization tool that runs on Microsoft Windows. The tool packages software applications into portable applications; these single executable files can be run instantly on any Windows computer. Turbo Studio emulates the operating system features that are necessary for applications to run and therefore reduces resource overhead. Turbo Studio allows the user to convert existing applications into virtual applications. Deployment models include standalone EXE, MSI package, and HTTP-based delivery via the Turbo browser plugin. Turbo packages application files, settings, runtimes, and components into a single package that runs without setup.

=== TurboServer ===
TurboServer
- Other names: Spoon Server
- Developer: Code Systems Corporation
- Stable release: 18.3.566 / March 5, 2018; 8 years ago
- Operating system: Microsoft Windows
- Available in: English
- Type: Digital distribution, containerization
- Website: turbo.net/server

TurboServer (formerly Spoon Server) is an application deployment platform that allows software packaged with Turbo Studio to be deployed, patched, and managed via the web. End users log into a website from any browser and are able to launch and use desktop-level applications like Microsoft Word and Photoshop without having to install them. It is a private version of the Turbo.net service. Applications are streamed to user desktops and run on clean desktops without administrative privileges. Desktops can be re-imaged and locked-down.

=== Turbo ===
Turbo (formerly Spoonium) is a platform of tools that allows users to package Windows desktop applications and their dependencies into software containers. Application containers made with Turbo can run on any Windows machine without installers, app breaks, or dependencies. Containers can be used to streamline the software development life cycle. Developers can ensure that their applications run as intended by including specific dependencies within containers. Software testers can rapidly pull and test software without having to install dependencies, can test multiple application versions side-by-side, and can return application containers to their development teams in specific app states. System administrators can reduce failures due to differences in development, testing, production, and end-user environments. Their service is currently in an open beta.

== See also ==
- VMware ThinApp
- Windows To Go
