= WinPenPack =

Collection of Open Source Portable Software

winPenPack
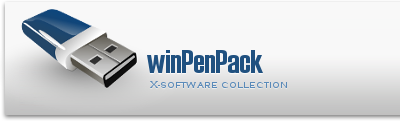

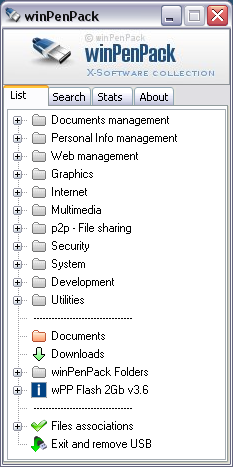
- winPenPack
- Developer: winPenPack Team
- Stable release: 4.5 / December 24, 2018; 6 years ago
- Operating system: Microsoft Windows
- Type: Portable software
- License: GNU GPLv2
- Website: www.winpenpack.com

winPenPack (often shortened to wPP) is an open-source software application suite for Windows. It is a collection of open source applications that have been modified to be executed directly from a USB flash drive (or any other removable storage device) without prior installation. WinPenPack programs are distributed as free software, and can be downloaded individually or grouped into suites.

== History ==
The creator, Danilo Leggieri, put the site winPenPack.com online on 23 November 2005. The project and the associated community then grew quickly. Since that date, 15 new versions and hundreds of open-source portable applications were released. The project is well known in Italy and abroad. It is hosted on SourceForge. The collections are regularly distributed bundled with popular PC magazines in Italy and worldwide. A thriving community of users is actively contributing to the growth of the project. The site currently hosts various projects created and suggested by forum members, and is also used for bug reporting and suggestions.

=== Press coverage ===
Since May 2006, winPenPack has been covered by most major Italian PC publications including: PC Professionale, Win Magazine, Computer Magazine, Total Computer, Internet Genius, Quale Computer, Computer Week, and many others.

== Features ==
=== Portable software ===
All the applications available in the winPenPack suites are portable applications. Portable applications:

- do not require installation
- can be executed from any USB flash drive, and from any PC hard disk drive (internal or external)
- leave no traces of their use in the Windows applications registry or any other user folder in the host PC hard drive
- do not conflict with the programs installed in the host PC hard drive (for example, X-Firefox executed from a USB flash drive does not modify (or conflict with) the counterpart Firefox program installed on the host PC)

=== X-Software ===
X-Software is software that has been modified with X-Launcher to be executed as if it were a portable application. X-Launcher is a specific application which executes other applications in "portable mode" by means of recreating their original operating environment. A few examples of X-Software include X-Firefox (counterpart to Mozilla Firefox), X-Thunderbird (Mozilla Thunderbird), X-Gimp (GIMP), and others.

=== Main menu functions ===
The winPenPack main menu can be executed from any removable storage device (including, and especially, from USB flash drives). In each different winPenPack suite, the main menu is pre-configured to list all programs available (including programs belonging to other suites), and can be edited at any time. New programs can be added to the menu either manually (by means of the "Add" options or by drag-and-dropping them onto the menu) or automatically (please note that automatic installation is only available for X-Software, as opposed to portable applications).
