= Sophos =

UK security software company

Sophos Limited
- Type: Private
- Traded as: LSE: SOPH (2015–2020)
- Industry: Computer software
- Founded: 1985
- Founder: Jan Hruska; Peter Lammer
- Headquarters: Abingdon, Oxfordshire, England
- Key people: Joe Levy; (CEO)
- Products: Security software
- Services: Computer security
- Revenue: $1 billion (2023)
- Operating income: US$109 million (2019)
- Net income: US$26.9 million (2019)
- Owner: Thoma Bravo
- Number of employees: 4,400 (2022)
- Subsidiaries: Secureworks
- Website: www.sophos.com

Sophos Limited is a British security software and hardware company. It develops and markets managed security services and cybersecurity software and hardware, including managed detection and response, incident response, and endpoint security. Sophos was listed on the London Stock Exchange until it was acquired by Thoma Bravo, an American private equity firm, in March 2020.

== History ==
Sophos was founded by Jan Hruska and Peter Lammer and began producing its first antivirus and encryption products in 1985. During the late 1980s and into the 1990s, Sophos primarily developed and sold a range of security technologies in the UK, including encryption tools available for most users (private or business). In the late 1990s, Sophos focused on developing and selling antivirus technology and embarked on an international expansion program.

In 2010, the majority interest of Sophos was sold to Apax Partners $830 million.

In June 2015, Sophos announced plans to raise US$100 million on the London Stock Exchange. Sophos was floated on the FTSE in September 2015.

On 14 October 2019, Sophos announced that Thoma Bravo, a US-based private equity firm, made an offer to acquire Sophos for US$7.40 per share, representing an enterprise value of approximately US$3.9 billion. On 2 March 2020, Sophos announced the completion of the acquisition.

In February 2024, President Joe Levy was appointed acting CEO after Kris Hagerman resigned. Levy was named the permanent CEO in May 2024.

In October 2024, Sophos released a report about its Pacific Rim counter-offensive operation, detailing actions taken against China-based adversaries along with additional information concerning this effort. It was reported by Wired that the company had been targeted for years by hackers affiliated with the University of Electronic Science and Technology of China and Sichuan Silence Information Technology, a company associated with China's Ministry of Public Security. The attacks were attributed to Chinese advanced persistent threats such as APT41, APT31, and Volt Typhoon. The Federal Bureau of Investigation (FBI) asked for the public's help in identifying the attackers.

== Acquisitions and partnerships ==
In 2003, Sophos acquired ActiveState, a Canadian software company that developed anti-spam software. From September 2003 to February 2006, Sophos served as the parent company of ActiveState, a developer of programming tools for dynamic programming languages: in February 2006, ActiveState became an independent company when it was sold to Vancouver-based venture capitalist firm Pender Financial.

In 2007, Sophos acquired ENDFORCE, a company based in Ohio, United States, which developed and sold security policy compliance and network access control (NAC) software.

In July 2008, Sophos agreed to acquire Utimaco, a publicly-held company focused on encryption and other data security products, for over $340 million; the acquisition closed for $314 million in September 2008. In October 2013, Utimaco was divested via a management buyout involving investors PINOVA Capital and BIP Investment Partners.

In May 2011, Sophos announced the acquisition of Astaro, a privately held provider of network security products, headquartered in Wilmington, Massachusetts, USA and Karlsruhe, Germany. Sophos subsequently renamed the Astaro UTM to Sophos UTM.

In February 2014, Sophos announced that it had acquired Cyberoam Technologies, a provider of network security products.

In December 2015, Sophos merged with Surfright, the company behind the malware scanner HitmanPro. HitmanPro Alert, an anti-malware program designed to detect and stop malicious behavior, was integrated into Sophos.

In November 2016, Sophos acquired Barricade, a start-up with a behavior-based analytics engine.

In February 2017, Sophos acquired Invincea, a software company that provides malware threat detection, prevention, and pre-breach forensic intelligence.

In October 2024, Sophos agreed to acquire SecureWorks, a publicly held company majority-owned by Dell focused on Extended Detection and Response (XDR), for $859 million. Sophos completed its acquisition of Secureworks in February 2025. In the same year, Sophos entered into a partnership with the French cybersecurity provider IMS Networks to integrate the Sophos Taegis XDR platform into IMS Networks' security operations centre (SOC). Under the agreement, IMS Networks operates a detection and incident response service on a 24/7 basis from France, using the cloud-native Taegis platform, which originated from Sophos's acquisition of SecureWorks.

In 2026, Sophos acquired Arco Cyber, a British cybersecurity assurance company whose platform tests whether an organisation's security controls are effective and links them to risk and compliance frameworks.

== See also ==
- Antivirus software
