= Workspace virtualization =

Workspace virtualization is a way of distributing applications to client computers using application virtualization; however, it also bundles several applications together into one complete workspace.

== Overview ==
Workspace virtualization is an approach that encapsulates and isolates an entire computing workspace. At a minimum, the workspace consists of everything above the operating system kernel – applications, data, settings, and any non-privileged operating system subsystems required to provide a functional desktop computing environment. By doing this, applications within the workspace can interact with each other, enabling them to do some of the things users are accustomed to and which are missing in application virtualization such as embedding a Microsoft Excel worksheet into a Microsoft Word document. Further, the workspace contains applications settings and user data enabling the user to move to a different operating system or to a different computer and still preserve applications, settings and data in one complete working unit. For deeper workspace virtualization, the virtualization engine implementation virtualizes privileged code modules and full operating system subsystems through a kernel-mode Workspace Virtualization Engine (WVE).

== Advantages and disadvantages ==
Workspace Virtualization vs Application Virtualization

Workspace virtualization enables individual applications to interact with each other and also enables user settings/configuration and user data to stay within the workspace. Application virtualization does not. Application Virtualization shields independent applications from each other better should one of them prove to be hostile (i.e. contains a virus of some sort).

Workspace Virtualization vs Desktop Virtualization

Workspace Virtualization runs directly on the client computer hardware whereas Desktop Virtualization in many cases runs on a remote computer somewhere over a corporate LAN/WAN or over the Internet (called Hosted Desktop Virtualization).

In other cases Desktop Virtualization can be run on the client directly through a virtual machine environment such as VMware Workstation, VirtualBox or Thincast Workstation. Because the applications in a Desktop Virtualization environment run at a different location, on a remote machine or in a local virtual machine, and technology simply offers a way to present the graphics interface locally using technologies such as Remote Desktop. As a result, the graphics system is much slower and access to local data services such as USB or FireWire-connected cameras, scanners, & hard drives is much slower. Workspace virtualization, on the other hand, offers the advantage that the amount of time required to move from one client computer to another is small because applications, settings and data are stored locally on the client. When it comes to system resources, Workspace Virtualization requires fewer resources than Desktop Virtualization because it doesn't contain a complete copy of the operating system running in a virtualization environment.

== See also ==
- Application virtualization
- Desktop virtualization
- Platform virtualization
