= Censorship in the United States =

In the United States, censorship involves the suppression of speech or public communication and raises issues of freedom of speech, which is protected by the First Amendment to the United States Constitution. Interpretation of this fundamental freedom has varied since its enshrinement. Traditionally, the First Amendment was regarded as applying only to the Federal government, leaving the U.S. states and the local communities free to censor or not. As the applicability of states' rights in lawmaking vis-a-vis citizens' national rights began to wane in the wake of the Civil War, censorship by any level of government eventually came under scrutiny, but not without resistance. For example, in recent decades, censorial restraints increased during the 1950s period of widespread anti-communist sentiment, as exemplified by the hearings of the House Committee on Un-American Activities. In Miller v. California (1973), the U.S. Supreme Court found that the First Amendment's freedom of speech does not apply to obscenity, which can, therefore, be censored. While certain forms of hate speech are legal so long as they do not turn to action or incite others to commit illegal acts, more severe forms have led to people or groups (such as the Ku Klux Klan) being denied marching permits or the Westboro Baptist Church being sued, although the initial adverse ruling against the latter was later overturned on appeal to the U.S. Supreme Court case Snyder v. Phelps.

The First Amendment protects against government censorship but not against censorship by corporations or other private entities, which are permitted to control the speech of their spokespersons, employees, or business associates by threatening monetary loss, loss of employment, or loss of access to the marketplace. However, the government often uses corporations as proxies for censorship, a practice often called "jawboning" or censorship-by-proxy. This occurs when officials use informal pressure, implicit threats, or regulatory leverage to coerce corporations, such as social media, news organizations, banks, broadcasters, advertisers, and payment networks, to censor speech on the government's behalf. Many of these corporations are either on board with such censorship or can be pressured into censoring because they depend on government licenses, regulatory approvals, or antitrust clearance.

Analysts from Reporters Without Borders ranked the United States 57th in the world out of 180 countries in their 2025 Press Freedom Index and they gave the country a "problematic" designation. Certain forms of speech, such as obscenity and defamation, are restricted in communications media by the government or by the industry on its own.

== History ==
=== Colonial government ===
Censorship came to British America with the Mayflower "when the governor of Plymouth, Massachusetts, William Bradford learned [in 1629] that Thomas Morton of Merrymount, in addition to his other misdeed, had 'composed sundry rhymes and verses, some tending to lasciviousness' the only solution was to send a military expedition to break up Morton's high-living."

A celebrated legal case in 1734–1735 involved John Peter Zenger, a New York newspaper printer who regularly published material critical of the corrupt Governor of New York, William Cosby. He was jailed eight months before being tried for seditious libel. Andrew Hamilton defended him and was made famous for his speech, ending in "nature and the laws of our country have given us a right to liberty of both exposing and opposing arbitrary power ... by speaking and writing the truth." Zenger's lawyers attempted to establish the precedent that a statement, even if defamatory, is not libelous if it can be proved. While the judge ruled against his arguments, Hamilton urged jury nullification in the cause of liberty and won a not guilty verdict. The Zenger case paved the way for freedom of the press to be adopted in the U.S. Constitution. As Founding Father Gouverneur Morris stated, "The trial of Zenger in 1735 was the germ of American freedom, the morning star of that liberty which subsequently revolutionized America."

=== 19th century ===
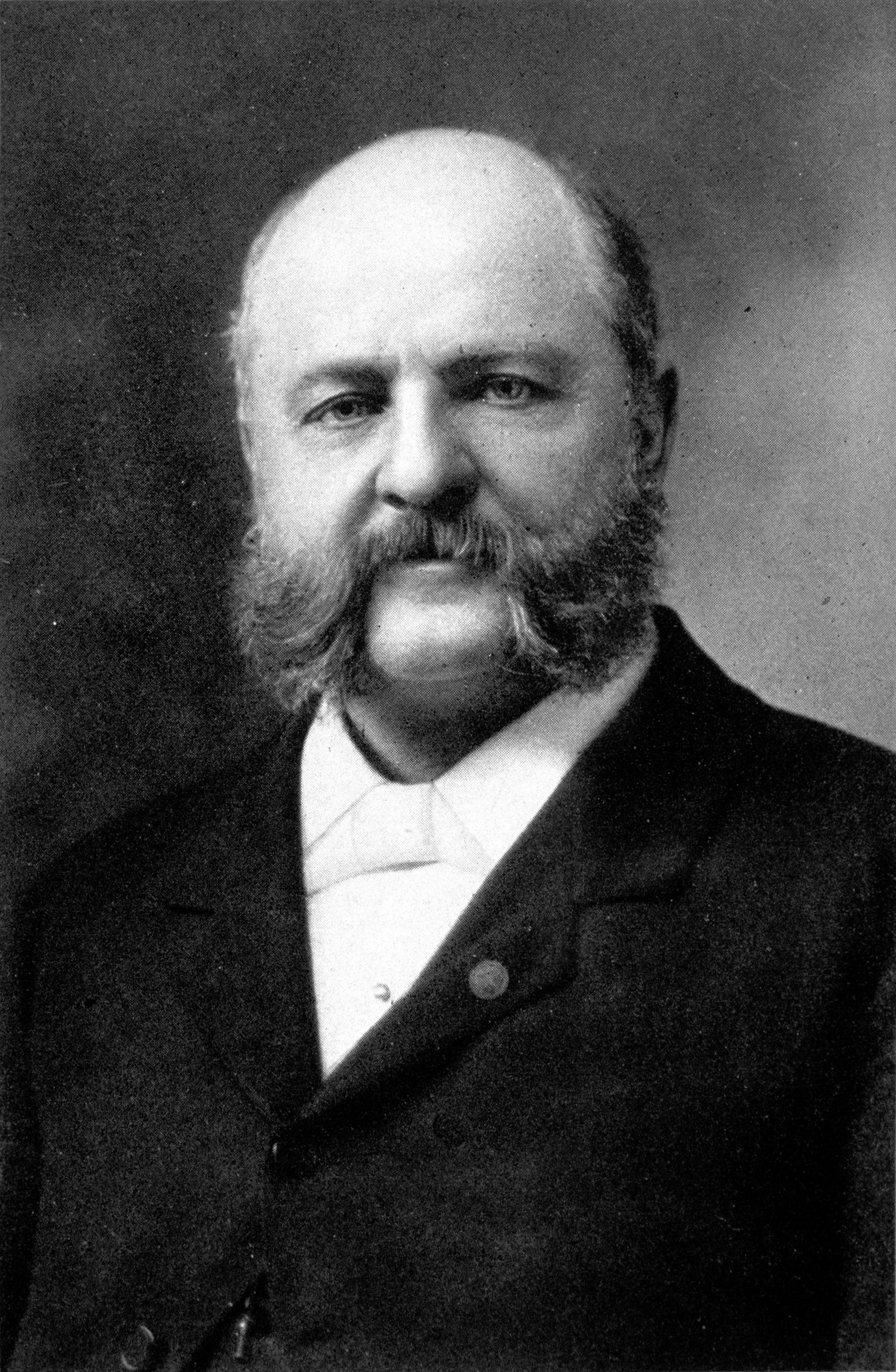
Anti-vice crusader Anthony Comstock, whose name became synonymous with censorship of anything that frankly discussed human sexuality

Beginning in the 1830s and until the American Civil War, the U.S. Postmaster General refused to allow mailmen to carry abolitionist pamphlets to the South.

From 1836 to 1844 the House of Representatives banned discussing slavery.

On March 3, 1873, significant censorship legislation, the Comstock Law, was passed by the United States Congress under the Grant administration; an Act for the "Suppression of Trade in, and Circulation of, Obscene Literature and Articles of Immoral Use." The Act criminalized usage of the U.S. Postal Service to send any of the following items: erotica; contraceptives; abortifacients; sex toys; personal letters alluding to any sexual content or information; or any information regarding the above items.

The law was named after Anthony Comstock, U.S. Postal Inspector and founder of the New York Society for the Suppression of Vice, who was known for his crusades against sexual expression and education. Comstock's name became a byword for censorship, inspiring terms such as "comstockery" and "comstockism" to refer to such activities. He opposed the distribution of information about abortion and birth control, and he is credited with having destroyed 15 tons of books, almost 4,000,000 pictures and 284,000 pounds of printing plates for making "objectionable" books.

=== 20th century ===
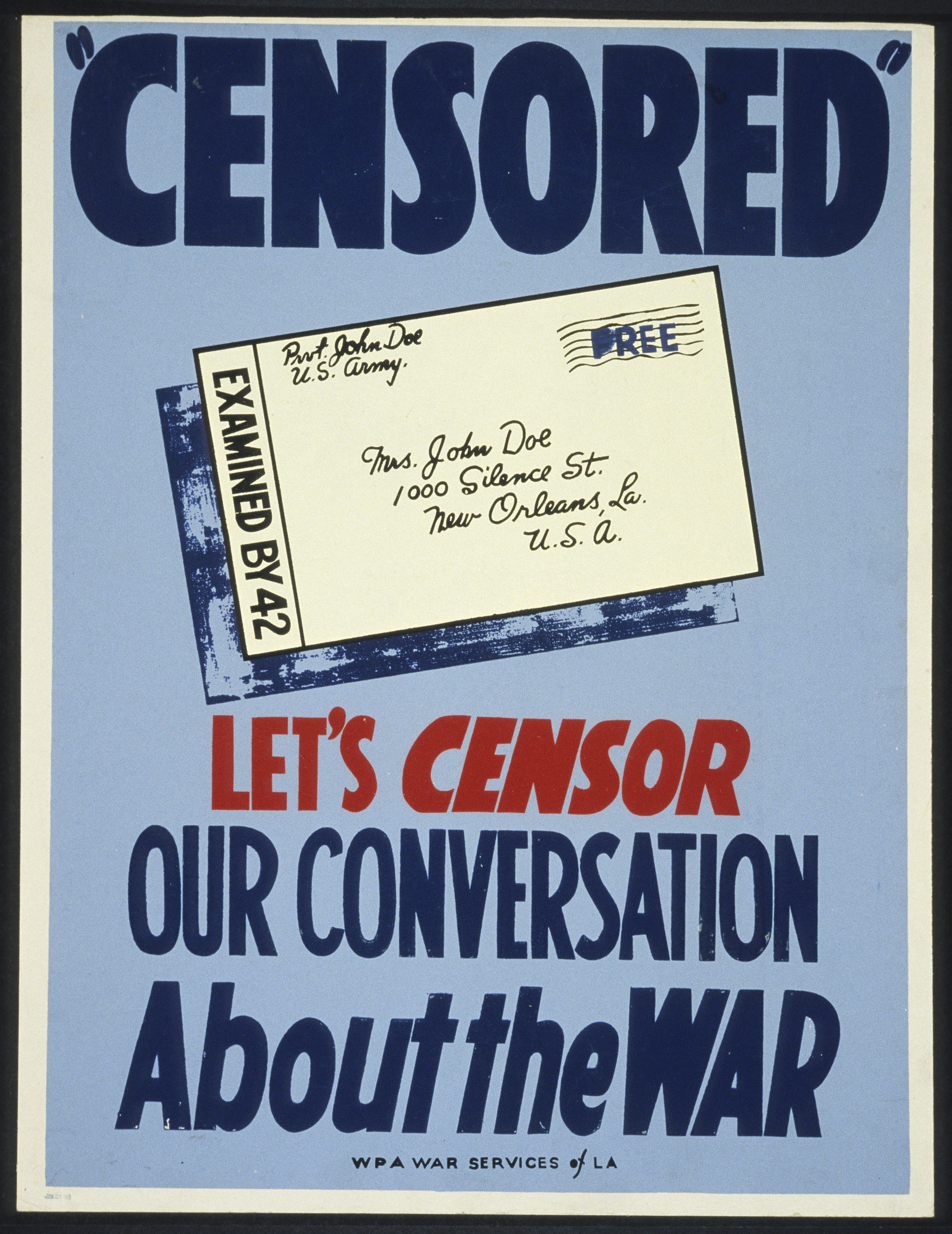
WPA poster, 1943

==== Wilson administration ====
The Sedition Act of 1918 (Pub. L. 65–150, 40 Stat. 553, enacted May 16, 1918) was an Act of the United States Congress that extended the Espionage Act of 1917 to cover a broader range of offenses, notably speech and the expression of opinion that cast the government or the war effort in a negative light or interfered with the sale of government bonds.

It forbade the use of "disloyal, profane, scurrilous, or abusive language" about the United States government, its flag, or its armed forces or that caused others to view the American government or its institutions with contempt. Those convicted under the act generally received sentences of imprisonment for five to 20 years. The act also allowed the Postmaster General to refuse to deliver mail that met those same standards for punishable speech or opinion. It applied only to times "when the United States is in war." The U.S. was in a declared a state of war at the time of passage, the First World War. The law was repealed on December 13, 1920.

Though the legislation enacted in 1918 is commonly called the Sedition Act, it was actually a set of amendments to the Espionage Act.

==== Franklin D. Roosevelt administration ====
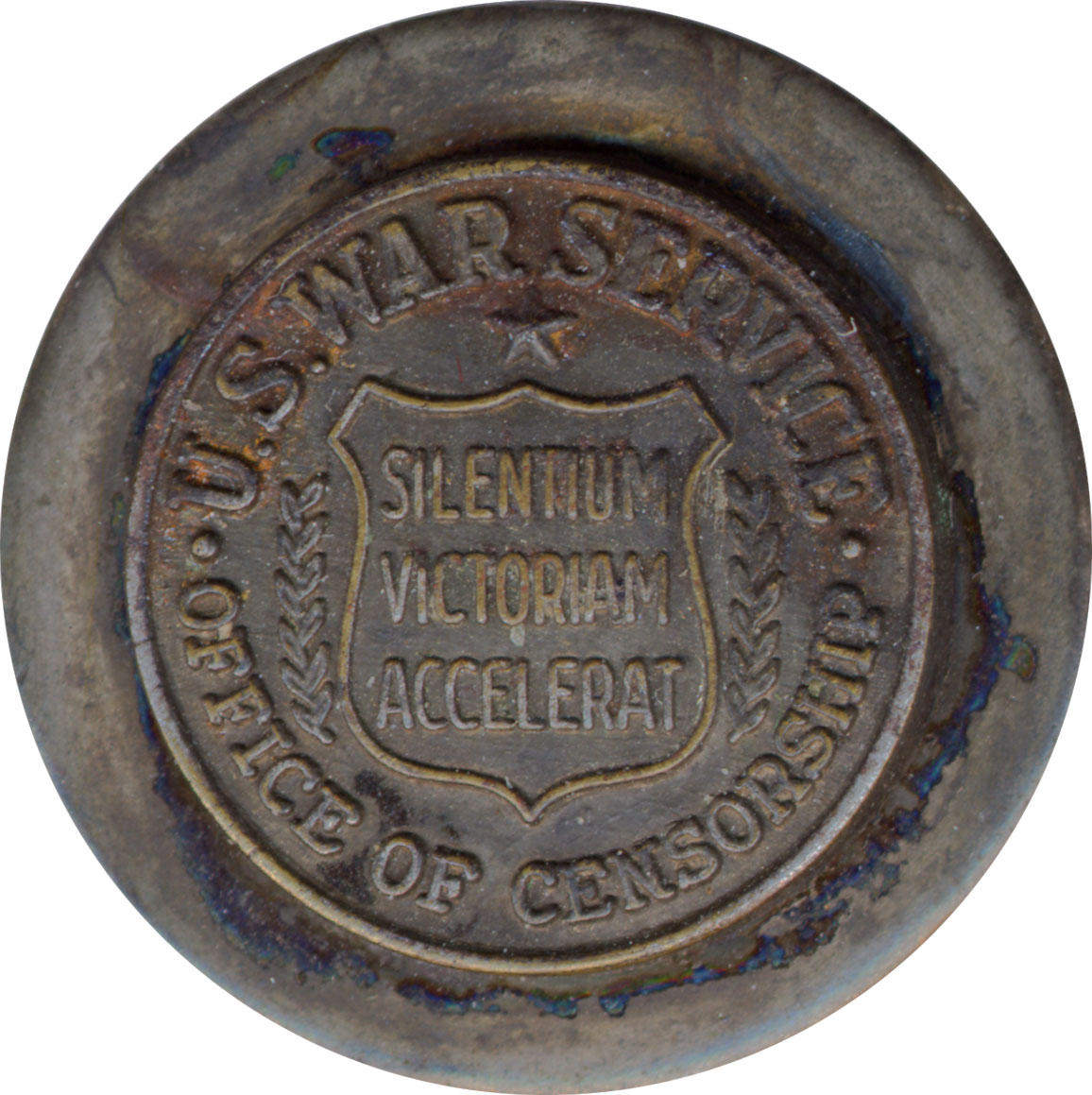
An employee pin from United States Office of Censorship during World War II

The "Radio Priest" Charles Coughlin started broadcasting in 1926 and entertained an audience of millions in the 1930s, but became increasingly anti-democratic, antisemitic, and sympathetic to Nazi Germany. Coughlin was denied a license when the government first started requiring them for broadcasters, forcing him to purchase air time from others. He was forced off the air completely when the private National Association of Broadcasters adopted rules banning "spokesmen of controversial public issues". The mailing permit of Coughlin's newspaper Social Justice was suspended under the Espionage Act of 1917, confining delivery to the local Boston area. The paper was shut down after the government persuaded Coughlin's bishop to stop his political activities entirely.

The Office of Censorship, an emergency wartime agency, heavily censored reporting during World War I, and to a greater extent during World War II, war correspondents accompanied military forces, and their reports were subject to advance censorship to preserve military secrets. The extent of such censorship was not generally challenged, and no major court case arose from this issue; even the Supreme Court found it constitutional on the grounds that it "protected free speech from tyranny."

On December 19, 1941, President Franklin Roosevelt signed Executive Order 8985, which established the Office of Censorship and conferred on its director the power to censor international communications in "his absolute discretion." Byron Price was selected as the Director of Censorship. However, censorship was not limited to reporting; postal censorship also took place. "Every letter that crossed international or U.S. territorial borders from December 1941 to August 1945 was subject to being opened and scoured for details."

Racial Censorship During World War Two Under the Roosevelt Administration

As ordered by the Roosevelt administration, the Office of War Information (OWI) and the Office of Censorship worked hard to present the American public with the most sanitized version of the Second World War. Not only were the images of dead G.I’s and the results of American bombings shielded from public consumption, but so were images and information regarding the contributions, actions, and accolades of African-American Soldiers. The OWI and the Office of Censorship were tasked with encouraging “widespread and enthusiastic participation in the war effort while minimizing concern over disruptions to the existing social order,” thus creating the censorship of anything that may alarm America that World War Two (WWII) was threatening the American, segregationist, way of life. Over the course of the almost four years that the United States was directly involved in WWII, the OWI prevented the distribution of photographs that showed wounded Black soldiers, candid racial unity or integration, and racial disturbances both at home and abroad. They also used the framing process of segmentation to show African-American soldiers different films in preparation for the war and to distribute certain material to different news outlets based on race.

The OWI had to walk a fine line between keeping white America happy, Black America willing to continue to send their sons off to war, and presenting images of racial unity outwardly, in order to “make Hitler mad.” In efforts to combat Hitler’s disgusting rhetoric towards Black people and other minority groups, the OWI suggested to Hollywood that they integrate Black soldiers into “crowd scenes” and released a “pamphlet praising black achievements,", the latter of which garnered immense criticism, especially from Southern lawmakers and citizens. Despite these pushbacks, the OWI still needed to present a United States without racial segregation to its Axis enemies and crafted the poster titled “United We Win.” This poster depicts one Black and one White industrial worker collaborating on a task with a large American flag hanging above them, which becomes the focal point of the image.

While the OWI allowed for the creation and publication of the “United We Win” poster, there are many images of racial unity from the war that were censored and not released to the public. For instance, the Army did not release photographs of Black soldiers participating in “integrated social activities.” Among the images censored were Black soldiers posing with the winners of the Red Cross Colored Club’s dance contest in Italy and Black soldiers dancing in England alongside white women. Once the images of the Black soldiers dancing with the English women were published in 1943, the Bureau of Public Relations (BPR) halted the publication of “blacks mixing socially with white women." Eventually, after protesting by black soldiers, these photographs were allowed to be sent home to their families, but only if the images bore the stamp “For personal use-not for publication.”

Not only were images of black and white soldiers working together censored, but many photographs depicting Black soldiers participating in the war were not sanctioned for publishing. Images that showed wounded Black soldiers, specifically those of the 92nd Division, were not allowed to be published in order not to allow the “negro press to unduly emphasize" black soldiers' role in the war. This instruction not to publish images of injured Black soldiers also included the dead bodies of Black soldiers and their burials, erasing their mortal sacrifice from mainstream media. Photographs of Black soldiers handling White soldiers' bodies and conducting a burial service were also not circulated so as not to admit to the American public that Black soldiers were often given the more gruesome tasks. Even the images that did show Black soldiers fighting in the war, which were released to the public, were often censored by racist groups. Many Southern theaters would remove images of Black soldiers in their newsreels and feature films, including in Memphis, where film footage was regularly changed “to eliminate Negroes who do not portray menial characters."

During the war, propagandists used a tool known as “segmentation,” which “created different images for different groups,” to craft purposefully framed messaging. The OWI would send several different pieces of information and propaganda to Black newspapers that it would not send to White newspapers. They sent cartoons portraying Black Americans' accomplishments to Black publishers, including a story of C.C Spaulding, who founded North Carolina Mutual, a life insurance company. In another instance, the OWI distributed photographs of a light-skinned Black soldier throwing a grenade to Black publications, while an identical photograph, but with a White soldier throwing the grenade instead, was sent to mainstream newspapers and magazines.

Not only was the Black American public shown differing information and images, but so were Black soldiers, who were shown separate films in preparation for their service in the armed forces. One of these films was called Easy to Get, in which a Black G.I contract’s veneral disease, or gonorrhea, from a woman who seems “clean.” The film takes place in “a Negro quarter of a Southern town” and was made to warn soldiers about the danger of having unprotected sex. However, this film was solely shown to Black soldiers, conveying a heavy connotation that Black women were “easier” or that Black men were more likely to be risky while engaging in sexual behavior. Black soldiers were also shown “simpler” pamphlets than White soldiers due to the racist notion that they were not as smart as their White counterparts.

==== Truman administration ====
McCarthyism is the term describing a period of intense anti-communist suspicion in the United States that lasted roughly from the late 1940s to the late 1950s when the Smith Act trials of communist party leaders occurred. The Alien Registration Act or Smith Act of 1940 made it a criminal offense for anyone to "knowingly or willfully advocate, abet, advise or teach the ... desirability or propriety of overthrowing the Government of the United States or of any State by force or violence, or for anyone to organize any association which teaches, advises or encourages such an overthrow, or for anyone to become a member of or to affiliate with any such association." Hundreds of Communists were prosecuted under this law between 1941 and 1957. Eleven leaders of the Communist Party were charged and convicted under the Smith Act in 1949. Ten defendants were given sentences of five years and the eleventh was sentenced to three years. All of the defense attorneys were cited for contempt of court and were also given prison sentences. In 1951, twenty-three other leaders of the American Communist Party were indicted, including Elizabeth Gurley Flynn, a founding member of the American Civil Liberties Union who was removed from the board of the ACLU in 1940 due to her membership in a political organization which supported totalitarian dictatorship. By 1957, over 140 leaders and members of the Communist Party had been charged under the law. In 1952, the Immigration and Nationality, or McCarran-Walter Act was passed. This law allowed the government to deport immigrants or naturalized citizens engaged in subversive activities and also to bar suspected subversives from entering the country.

The Gag Law (Puerto Rico) was passed in 1948, with the purpose of suppressing the independence movement in Puerto Rico. The act made it a felony to sing a patriotic tune, speak or write of independence, meet with anyone or hold any assembly in favor of Puerto Rican independence, and own or display a Puerto Rican flag, with the flag of the United States being the only flag permitted to be flown on the island. The bill was signed into law on June 10, 1948, by Jesús T. Piñero, the United States-appointed governor. Opponents tried but failed to have the law declared unconstitutional by the United States Supreme Court.

The law remained in force for nine years until 1957, when it was repealed on the basis that it was unconstitutional as protected by freedom of speech within Article II of the Constitution of Puerto Rico and the First Amendment of the Constitution of the United States.

==== Eisenhower administration ====
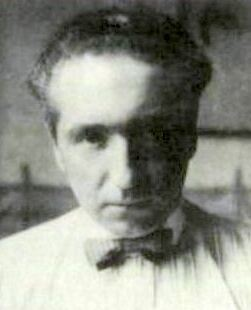
Austrian-American psychoanalyst Wilhelm Reich, whose publications were burned by order of a U.S. court

The Communist Control Act of 1954 was passed with overwhelming support in both houses of Congress after very little debate. Jointly drafted by Republican John Marshall Butler and Democrat Hubert Humphrey, the law was an extension of the Internal Security Act of 1950, and sought to outlaw the Communist Party by declaring that the party, as well as "Communist-Infiltrated Organizations" were "not entitled to any of the rights, privileges, and immunities attendant upon legal bodies."

John W. Powell, a journalist who reported the allegations that US was carrying out germ warfare in the Korean War in an English-language journal in Shanghai, the "China Monthly Review", was indicted with 13 counts of sedition, along with his 2 editors. All defendants were acquitted of all charges over the next six years, but Powell was blackballed from the journalism industry for the rest of his life.

The book-burning of Wilhelm Reich's work took place between 1956 and 1960. It has been cited as the worst example of censorship in the United States. The Guardian called it "the only federally sanctioned book burning on American soil." (Note: Encyclopædia Britannica, 2015: "From 1956 to 1960 many of his writings and his equipment were seized and destroyed by FDA officials. In the 21st century some considered this wholesale destruction to be one of the most blatant examples of censorship in U.S. history." James Strick (historian of science), 2015: "In 1956 and again in 1960, officers of the U.S. government supervised the public burning of the books and scientific instruments of Austrian-born scientist Wilhelm Reich. This was one of the most heinous acts of censorship in U.S. history, as New York publisher Roger Straus was heard to remark many times over decades afterward, explaining why his firm, Farrar, Straus, and Giroux, steadfastly brought all of Reich's published works back into print beginning in 1960.") He died in prison of heart failure just over a year later, days before he was due to apply for parole.

In 1960, The China Lobby in American Politics, by scholar Ross Y. Koen, was suppressed by the State Department, the Central Intelligence Agency and the Federal Bureau of Narcotics at the behest of the Chinese Nationalist Party – at that time the ruling party of the military dictatorship in Taiwan. The book largely concerns the influence of the China lobby in the US congress and the executive branch of the government. It also details heroin trafficking by the Chinese Nationalist Party, which was later corroborated by other scholars. After 4000 copies of the book had been printed, at the intervention of the State Department the publisher recalled the book and discontinued publication. Some copies of the book nevertheless found their way into rare book repositories at some universities. According to Richard C. Kagan, right-wing groups stole many remaining copies of the book from libraries. The book was reprinted in 1974 after other scholars had shown Koen's findings to be accurate.

==== Nixon administration ====
In later conflicts, the degree to which war reporting was subject to censorship varied, and in some cases, it has been alleged that the censorship was as much political as military in purpose. This was particularly true during the Vietnam War. The executive branch of the federal government attempted to prevent The New York Times from publishing the top-secret Pentagon Papers during the Vietnam War, warning that doing so would be considered an act of treason under the Espionage Act of 1917. The newspaper prevailed in the famous New York Times Co. v. United States case.

==== Clinton administration ====
The Child Online Protection Act, passed in 1998 and signed by Bill Clinton, was criticized and legally challenged by civil liberties groups, claiming that it "reduces the Internet to what is fit for a six-year-old. Through legal actions and permanent injunction, the act never took effect.

=== 21st century ===
==== George W. Bush administration ====
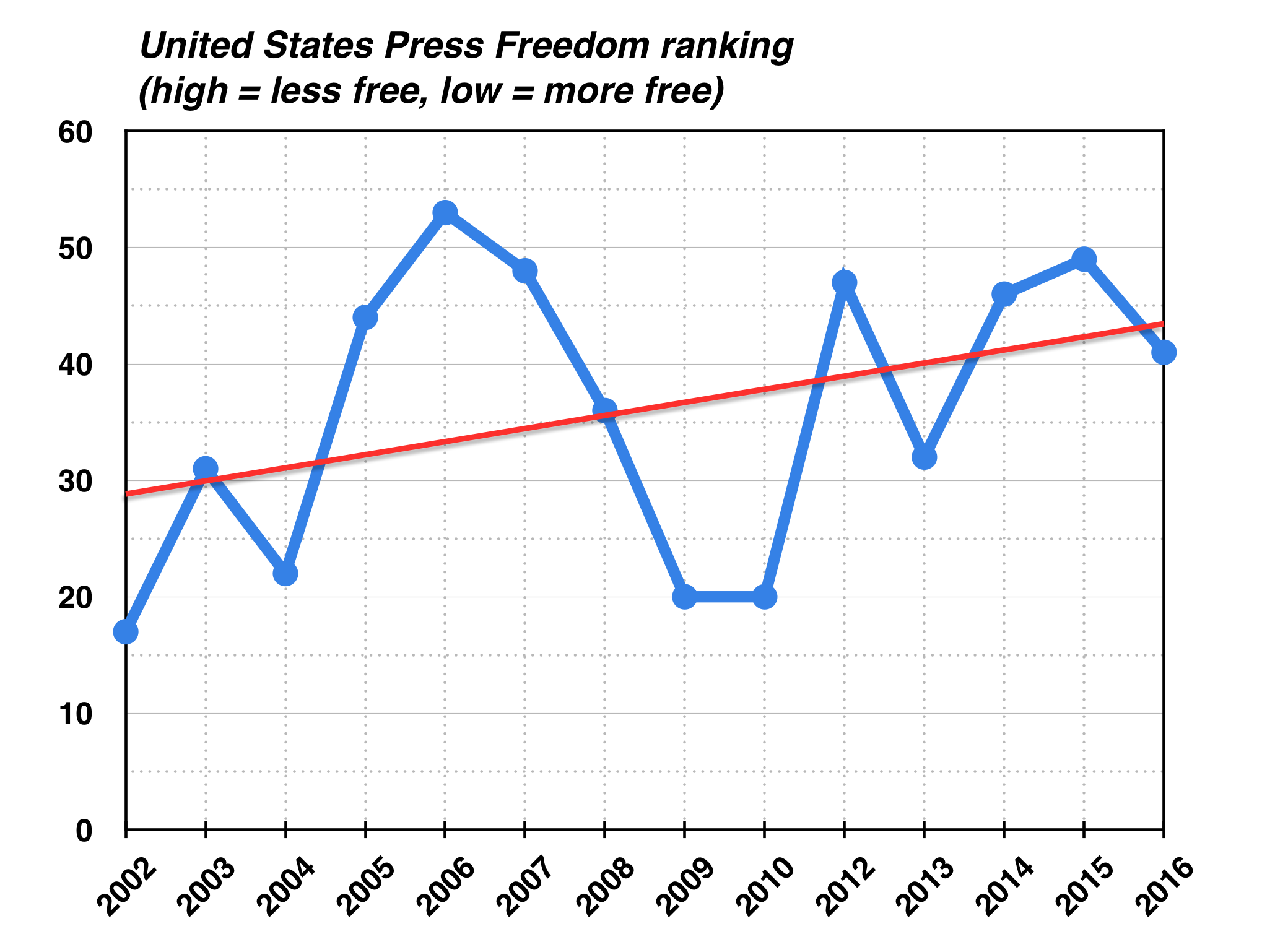
Press Freedom Ranking of the United States Source: Reporters Without Borders

Press censorship issues arose again during the administration of President George W. Bush during the 2003 invasion of Iraq. Journalists who were embedded within the armed forces had to accept certain terms and restrictions on what they were reporting and additionally were required to make their reports available to media operations staff prior to publication. This process was put in place to avoid compromising security or endangering troops by revealing exact locations.

President Bush's administration also attempted to censor results of climate studies: "nearly half of 1,600 government scientists at seven agencies ranging from NASA to the EPA had been warned against using terms like 'global warming' in reports or speeches, throughout Bush's eight-year presidency."

==== Obama administration ====
In July 2014, the Society of Professional Journalists published an open letter signed by 38 journalist organizations to Barack Obama, criticizing efforts to "stifle or block" coverage, despite his 2008 campaign promises to provide transparency. The letter cited several examples in which the administration blocked reporters from speaking directly to specific staff without obtaining prior approval from the head of their department. Obama's use of the Espionage Act was criticized as aggressive by CNN journalist Jake Tapper. Tapper would later clarify that he was not implying such use was towards actual whistleblowers.

==== First Trump administration ====
Following the first election of president Donald Trump, his administration pursued means of preventing federal staff from speaking publicly with the American Association for the Advancement of Science, "the largest scientific society in the world", warning of possible "censorship and intimidation" of the American scientific community. The Trump administration ordered the Environmental Protection Agency to scrub climate change information from its website, instructed that all studies by EPA and the United States Department of Agriculture be reviewed by political appointees before publication, and in some cases issued de facto gag orders to agencies that conduct research. The White House also denied access to a select group of media outlets including The New York Times, CNN, BBC and The Guardian during a press gaggle while allowing right-wing outlets and blogs to participate, with the National Press Club describing the move as "unconstitutional censorship."

In 2017, Trump suggested challenging NBC's and other TV news networks' network licenses on the grounds of allegedly propagating "fake news." On October 11, 2017, Trump posted a tweet saying, "With all of the Fake News coming out of NBC and the Networks, at what point is it appropriate to challenge their License? Bad for country!"

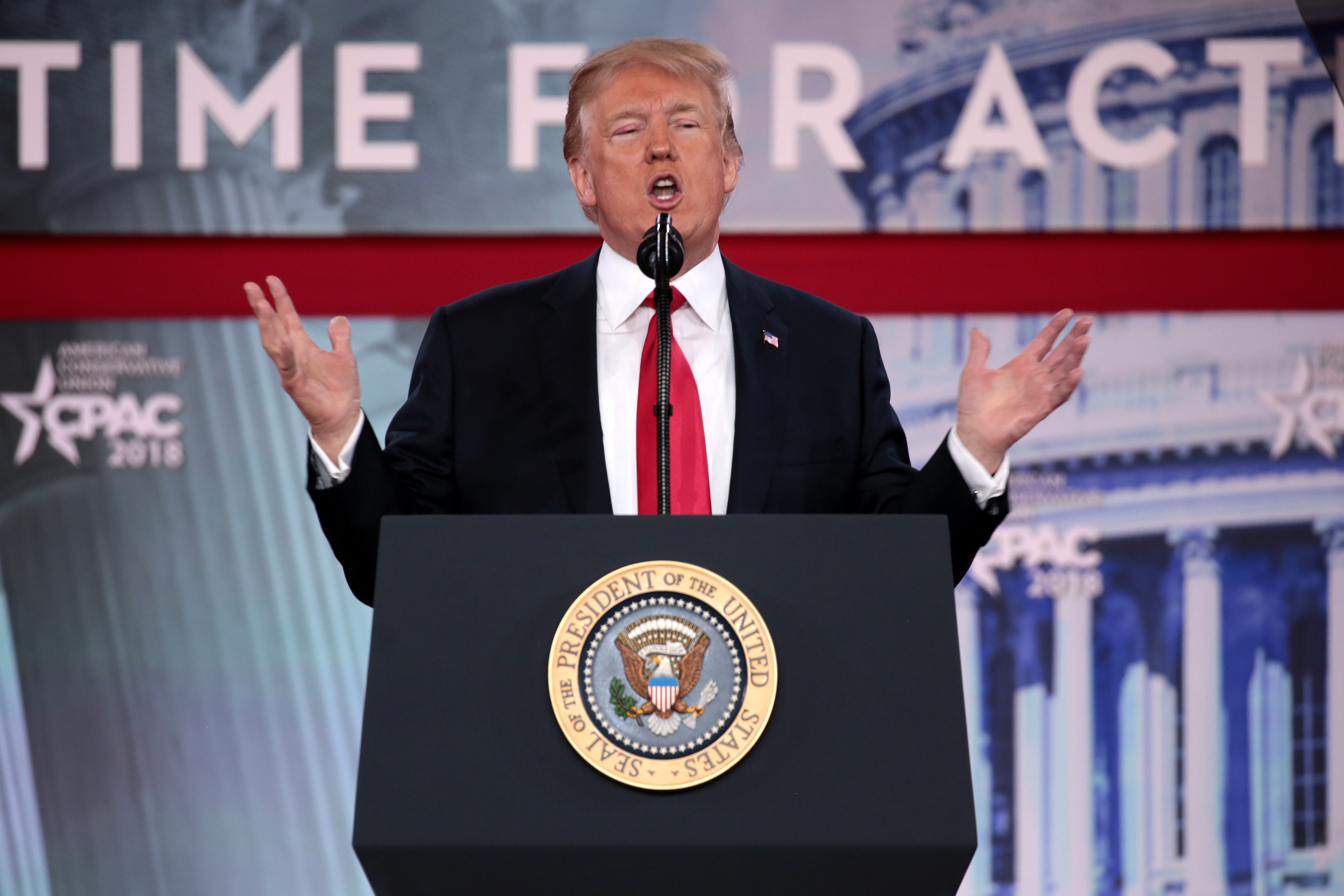
Battles over censorship and freedom of speech occurred frequently during Donald Trump's presidencies.

In December 2017, The Washington Post said that the Trump administration had potentially banned the use of certain words by the Centers for Disease Control in its written budget proposal for FY2018. The Director of the CDC, Dr. Brenda Fitzgerald, disputed this, saying "I want to assure you there are no banned words at CDC. We will continue to talk about all our important public health programs."

Some conservative speakers and media personalities, such as Tucker Carlson and Sean Hannity, have said that former President Trump has been the target of social media censorship, and that privately owned social media companies Facebook and Twitter have censored of conservative talking points. Many prominent conservative political figures have claimed that social media sites such as Twitter removed posts with conservative leanings, but these sites have said that such removals were of hateful and inflammatory rhetoric and misinformation.

On January 8, 2021, two days after the January 6th attack on the U.S. Capitol by a mob of Trump supporters, the official Twitter account of Trump was permanently banned by Twitter. Twitter, in an official statement, announced the reasons, saying "After close review of recent Tweets from the @realDonaldTrump account and the context around them – specifically how they are being received and interpreted on and off Twitter – we have permanently suspended the account due to the risk of further incitement of violence." The riot at the United States Capitol left 1 rioter dead by gunshot while 4 others (including 1 Capitol officer) died due to medical complications following the event. Twitter also purged more than 70,000 other far-right accounts linked to the conspiracy theory Q-Anon. Following this, many conservative speakers and politicians claimed the President was the target of organized social media censorship. In the second impeachment of Donald Trump, his social media activity was presented as evidence by impeachment managers.

==== Second Trump administration ====
The second Trump administration has threatened legal action against various press agencies for reporting on events such as the January 6 United States Capitol attack, and has called for the impeachment of judges opposed to Trump's policies. The Trump administration has banned material from receiving US funding on various topics not approved by the Trump administration topics, such as race, gender and sexuality. Hundreds of artists wrote an open letter to the administration in response.

On February 14, 2025, The White House indefinitely banned the Associated Press, a non-profit news agency, from the Oval Office and Air Force One, for its continued use of the name "Gulf of Mexico" instead of "Gulf of America".

In February 2025, Secretary of State Marco Rubio announced that the State Department's Counter Foreign Information and Manipulation and Interference Office would be shut down, stating that it had wasted millions of dollars and engaged in censorship.

External videos
- A statue of Trump and Epstein appears in D.C., Reuters

On September 23, 2025, an anonymous group of artists had installed a statue of Trump and Jeffrey Epstein entitled "Best Friends Forever" on the National Mall in Washington, D.C. The 12-foot tall, bronze-sprayed statue depicted Trump and Epstein holding hands and dancing. A plaque underneath it read, "We celebrate the long-lasting bond between President Donald J. Trump and his 'closest friend,' Jeffrey Epstein". The group had a permit for an art installation from September 23 to September 28 for artwork "to demonstrate freedom of speech and artistic expression using political imagery". By the next morning U.S. Park Police had removed the statue, later saying it was not in compliance with the permit. A White House spokeswoman said in a September 23 email to the Washington Post that "Liberals are free to waste their money however they see fit — but it's not news that Epstein knew Donald Trump".

During the Iran war, Brendan Carr, chair of the Federal Communications Commission, threatened to revoke broadcasters' licenses over their coverage of the war. Some Democratic lawmakers interpreted this as a threat of censorship and retaliation against coverage of the war in the media.

In May 2026, NPR reported that commercial satellite imagery providers restricted or delayed the release of images from the conflict zone, including imagery showing damage to military sites. The report noted that some imagery was temporarily withheld or made less accessible during the fighting. The New Republic similarly reported that satellite companies limited access to imagery related to the war, which affected the ability of journalists and analysts to independently assess the extent of damage.

== Medium ==
=== Art ===
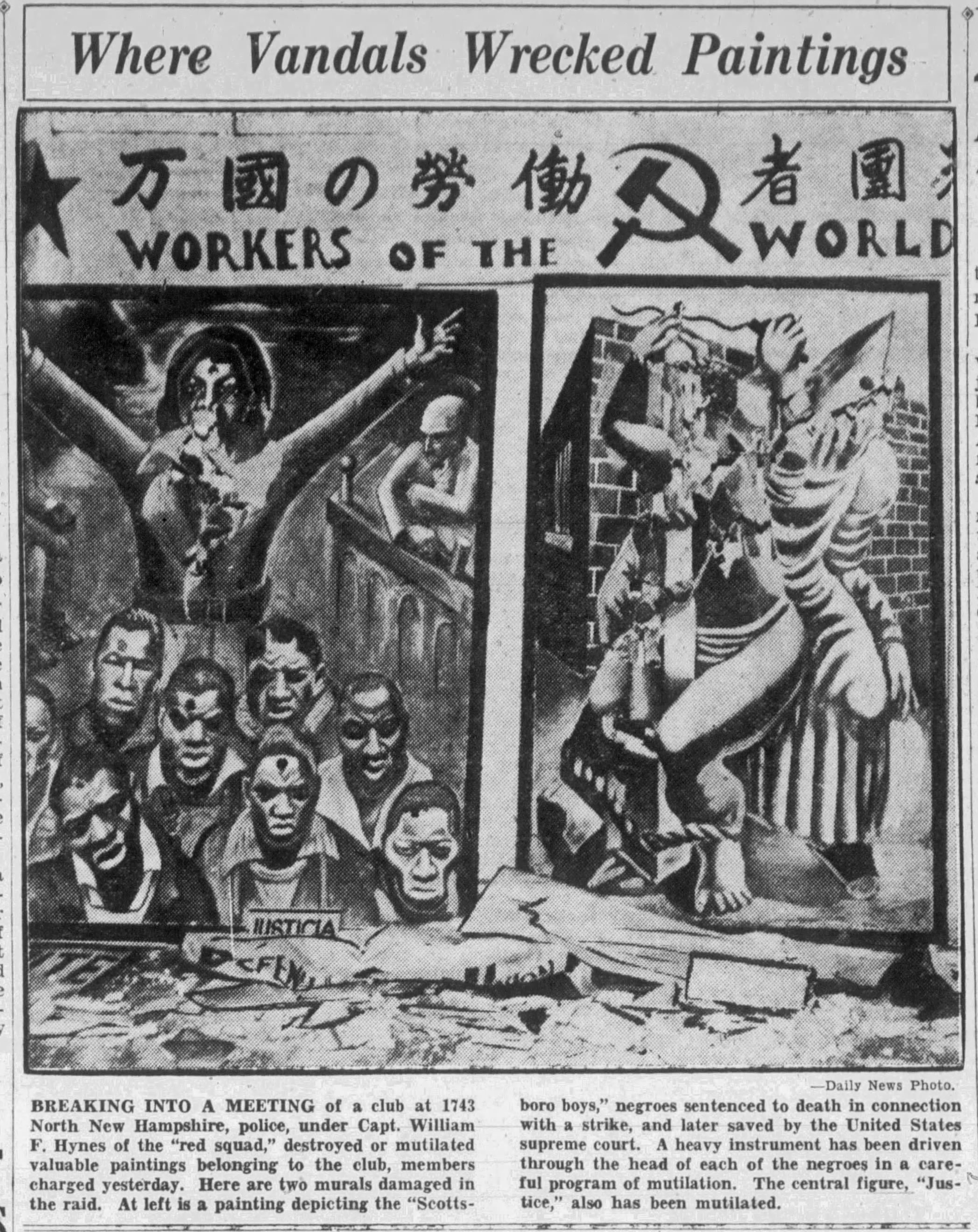
"Where Vandals Wrecked Paintings" - Illustrated Daily News article depicting paintings damaged by police during the John Reed Club raid

On February 11, 1933, members of the LAPD Red Squad raided and vandalized artworks at the John Reed Club, where leftist artists were exhibiting art to show support for the Scottsboro Boys. After an attorney representing the club attempted to press charges against Squad leader Red Hynes, a grand jury refused to hear his evidence.

A widely publicized case of prosecuting alleged obscenity occurred in 1990 when the Contemporary Arts Center in Cincinnati agreed to hold an art exhibition featuring the work of photographer Robert Mapplethorpe. His work included several artistic nude photographs of males and was deemed offensive by some. This resulted in the prosecution of the CAC director, Dennis Barrie, who was later acquitted.

In March 2023, several artists had their works removed from an exhibit focusing on health care issues at Lewis–Clark State College in Idaho. A cross-stitch depicting misoprostol and mifepristone, some documentaries showing women talking about their own experiences with abortion, and some of a series of 1920s-era letters written to Planned Parenthood founder Margaret Sanger were removed from the show.

To be censored like that is shocking and surreal. If the most even-keeled, bipartisan artwork around this topic is censored, then everything is going to be censored.

— Katrina Majkut

=== Broadcasting ===
The Federal Communications Commission (FCC) regulates "indecent" free-to-air broadcasting (both television and radio). Satellite, cable television, and Internet outlets are not subject to content-based FCC regulation. The FCC can issue fines if, for example, the broadcaster airs certain profane words. The Supreme Court in 1978 in FCC v. Pacifica Foundation upheld the commission's determination that George Carlin's classic "seven dirty words" monologue, with its deliberate, repetitive, and creative use of vulgarities, was indecent. But the court left open the question whether the use of "an occasional expletive" could be punished. Radio personality Howard Stern was a frequent target of fines, which led to his leaving broadcast radio and signing on with Sirius Satellite Radio in 2006. The Super Bowl XXXVIII halftime show controversy increased the political pressure on the FCC vigorously to police the airwaves. In addition, Congress increased the maximum fine the FCC can levy from US$268,500 to US$375,000 per incident.

The Supreme Court, in its 5–4 decision in FCC v. Fox Television Stations, Inc. (2009), said it did not find the FCC's policy on so-called fleeting expletives either "arbitrary or capricious", thereby dealing a blow to the networks in their efforts to scuttle the policy. But the case brought by Fox to the high court was a narrow challenge on procedural grounds to the manner in which the FCC handled its decision to toughen up its policy on fleeting expletives. Fox, with the support of ABC, CBS, and NBC, had argued that the commission did not give enough notice of nor properly explain the reasons for clamping down on fleeting expletives after declining to issue penalties for them in decades past.

The issue had first arisen in 2004, when the FCC sanctioned but did not fine NBC for Bono's use of the phrase "fucking brilliant" during the Golden Globes telecast. The instant case arose from two appearances by celebrities on the Billboard Music Awards. The first involved Cher, who reflected on her career in accepting an award in 2002: "I've also had critics for the last forty years saying I was on my way out every year. Right. So fuck 'em." The second passage came in an exchange between Paris Hilton and Nicole Richie in 2003 in which Richie asked, "Have you ever tried cleaning cow shit off a Prada purse? It's not so fucking simple."

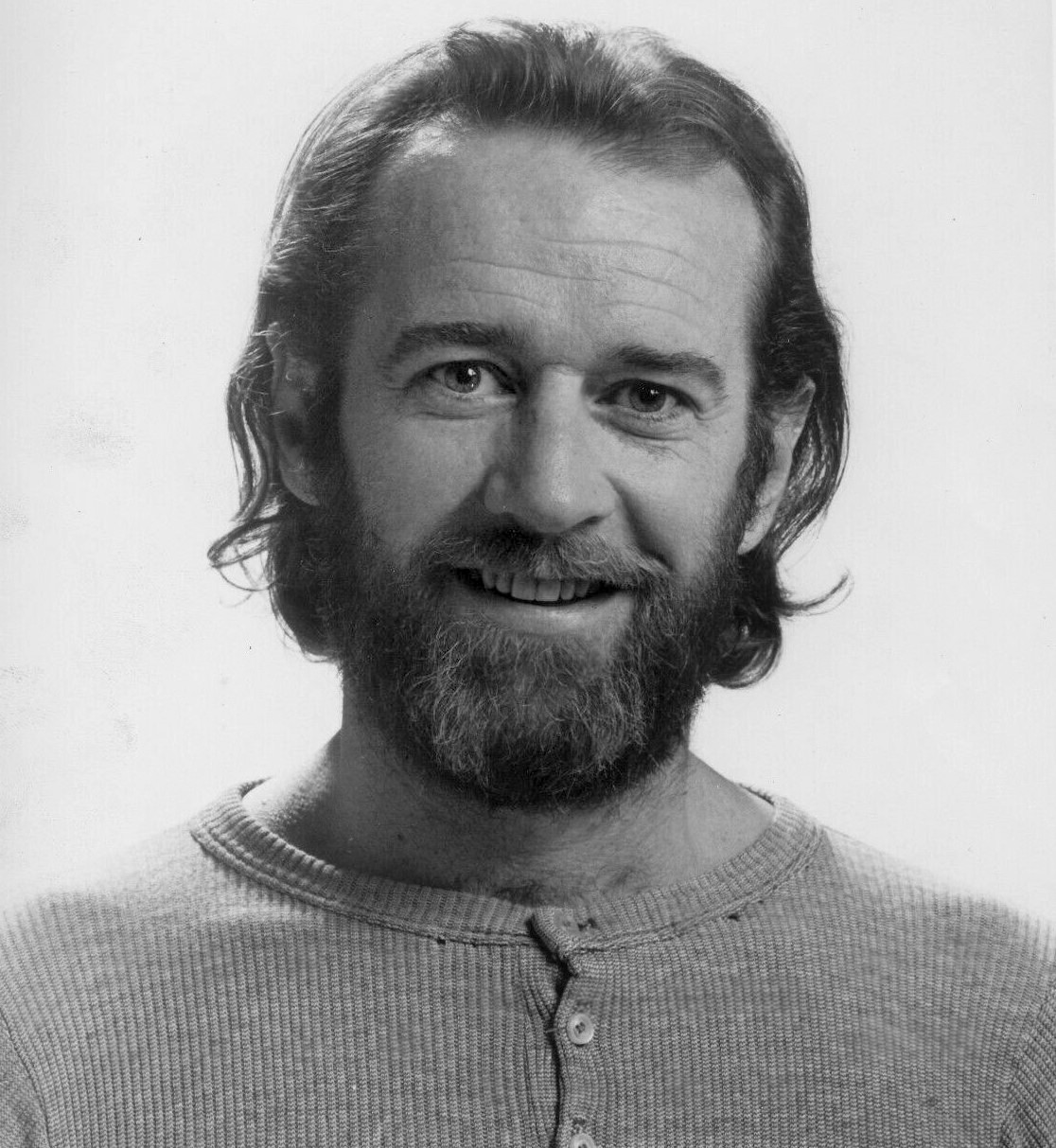
Comedian George Carlin's "seven dirty words" monologue was deemed indecent by the FCC.

The majority decision, written by Justice Antonin Scalia, reversed the lower appellate court's decision that the FCC's move was "arbitrary and capricious." "The commission could reasonably conclude," he wrote, "that the pervasiveness of foul language, and the coarsening of public entertainment in other media such as cable, justify more stringent regulation of broadcast programs so as to give conscientious parents a relatively safe haven for their children." Scalia's majority opinion was joined by Chief Justice John G. Roberts and Justices Clarence Thomas and Samuel A. Alito Jr. and (for the most part) by Justice Anthony M. Kennedy. Justices Stevens, Ginsburg, Souter, and Breyer dissented.

Justice Ruth Bader Ginsburg, dissenting, wrote that "there is no way to hide the long shadow the First Amendment casts over what the commission has done. Today's decision does nothing to diminish that shadow." Justice John Paul Stevens, dissenting, wrote that not every use of a swear word connotes the same thing: "As any golfer who has watched his partner shank a short approach knows," he wrote, "it would be absurd to accept the suggestion that the resultant four-letter word uttered on the golf course describes sex or excrement and is therefore indecent.... It is ironic, to say the least, that while the FCC patrols the airwaves for words that have a tenuous relationship with sex or excrement, commercials broadcast during prime-time hours frequently ask viewers whether they are battling erectile dysfunction or are having trouble going to the bathroom.... The FCC's shifting and impermissibly vague indecency policy only imperils these broadcasters and muddles the regulatory landscape." For 30 years, the FCC has had the power to keep "indecent" material off the airwaves from 6 a.m. to 10 p.m., and those rules "have not proved unworkable," Stevens added. Justice Breyer, dissenting, wrote that the law "grants those in charge of independent administrative agencies broad authority to determine relevant policy. But it does not permit them to make policy choices for purely political reasons nor to rest them primarily upon unexplained policy preferences." But the decision was limited to a narrow procedural issue; the Court sent the case back to the 2nd Circuit Court of Appeals in New York to address directly the constitutionality of the FCC's policy. The 2nd Circuit Court of Appeals had already said in its 2007 ruling that it was "skeptical" that the policy could "pass constitutional muster." Scalia said that the looming First Amendment question "will be determined soon enough, perhaps in this very case." The decision provided hints that the Court might approach the constitutional question differently. Some dissenting justices and Justice Clarence Thomas, who was in the majority, indicated that they might be receptive to a First Amendment challenge. Thomas, in a concurrence, said he was "open to reconsideration" of the two cases that gave television broadcasters far less First Amendment protection than books, newspapers, cable programs and Web sites have.

The FCC is also responsible for permitting transmitters to prevent interference between stations from obscuring each other's signals. Denial of the right to transmit could be considered censorship. Restrictions on low-power broadcasting stations have been particularly controversial and the subject of legislation in the 1990s and 2000s.

The Guardian reported U.S. censorship of U.S. media regarding Raymond Allen Davis, a CIA employee implicated in murder in that "A number of US media outlets learned about Davis's CIA role but have kept it under wraps at the request of the Obama administration." Colorado station KUSA censored an online report indicating Davis worked for the CIA when the station "removed the CIA reference from its website at the request of the US government."

On July 26, 2018, two WKXW radio show hosts were suspended for calling New Jersey attorney general Gurbir Grewal "turban man" on air.

From September 17 to the 22nd of 2025, popular late night talk show Jimmy Kimmel Live was temporarily taken off air by the American Broadcasting Corporation and its parent company The Walt Disney Company after host Jimmy Kimmel commented on the assassination of Charlie Kirk. The move was criticised as an act of censorship, sparking concerns surrounding conservative influence on mass media.

==== Journalism in warzones ====
Reporters are often obliged to "embed" themselves with a squad or unit of soldiers before being granted official access to fields of battle. Reporters are limited in what they may report by means of contracts, punishment, forced relocation, and the inherent nature of being tied to and reliant upon a military unit for protection and presence.

Wartime censorship often involves forms of mass surveillance. For international communications, like those done by Western Union and ITT, this mass surveillance continued after the wars were over. The Black Chamber received the information after World War I. After World War II NSA's Project SHAMROCK performed a similar function.

=== Film ===
The first act of movie censorship in the United States was an 1897 statute of the State of Maine that prohibited the exhibition of prizefight films. Maine enacted the statute to prevent the exhibition of the 1897 heavyweight championship between James J. Corbett and Robert Fitzsimmons. Other states soon followed Maine.

In 1915, the US Supreme Court decided the case Mutual Film Corporation v. Industrial Commission of Ohio in which the court determined that motion pictures were purely commerce and not an art, and thus not covered by the First Amendment. This decision was not overturned until the Supreme Court case, Joseph Burstyn, Inc. v. Wilson in 1952. Popularly referred to as the "Miracle Decision", the ruling involved the short film "The Miracle", part of Roberto Rossellini's anthology film L'Amore (1948).

Between the Mutual Film and the Joseph Burstyn decisions local, state, and city censorship boards had the power to edit or ban films. City and state censorship ordinances are nearly as old as the movies themselves, and such ordinances banning the public exhibition of "immoral" films proliferated.

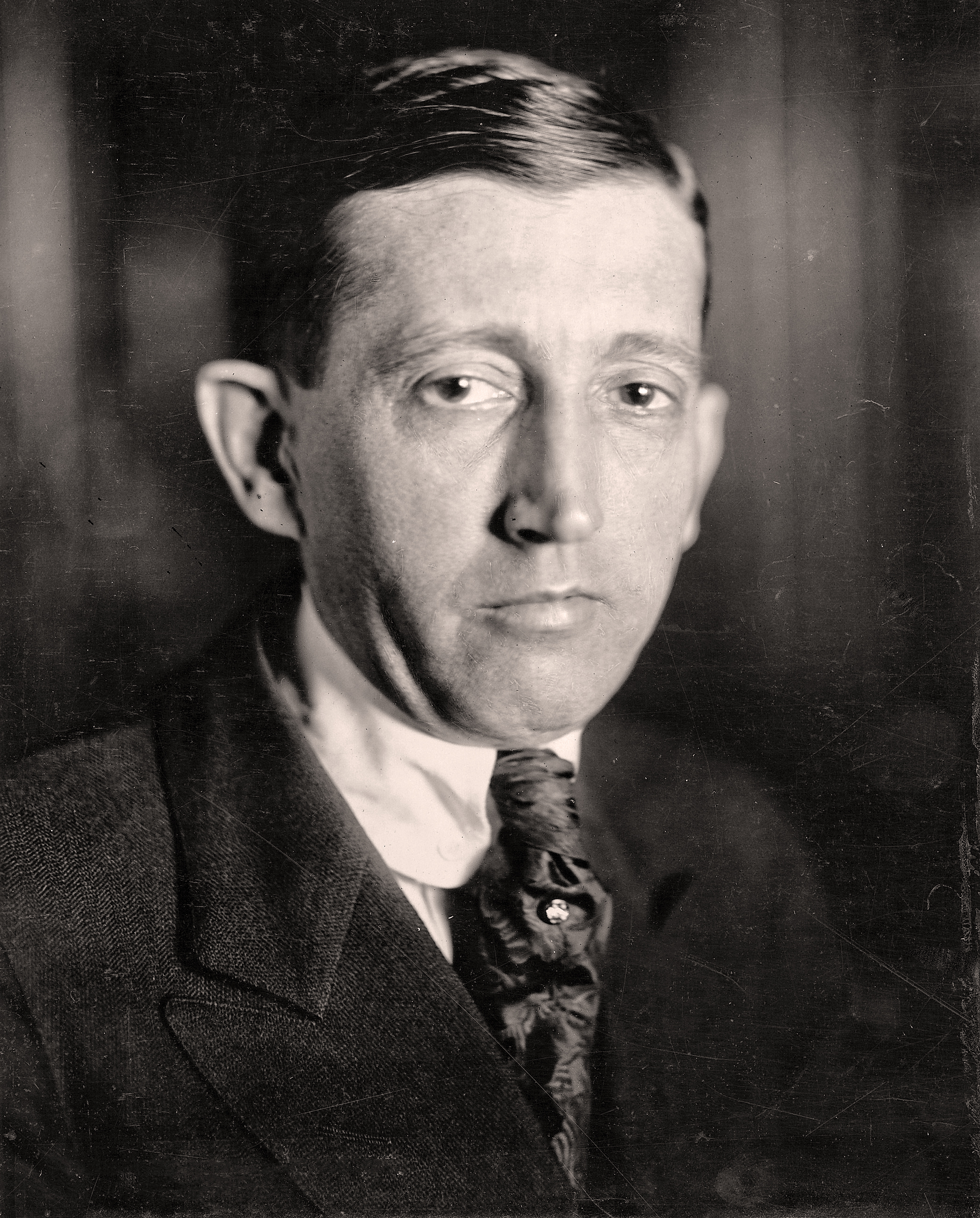
Will Hays, the first chairman of the Motion Picture Producers and Distributors of America and namesake of the 1930 Motion Picture Production Code, aka, the "Hays Code."

Public outcry over perceived immorality in Hollywood and the movies, as well as the growing number of city and state censorship boards, led the movie studios to fear that federal regulations were not far off; so they created, in 1922, the Motion Pictures Producers and Distributors Association (which became the Motion Picture Association of America in 1945), an industry trade and lobby organization. The association was headed by Will H. Hays, a well-connected Republican lawyer who had previously been United States Postmaster General; and he derailed attempts to institute federal censorship over the movies.

In 1927, Hays compiled a list of subjects, culled from his experience with the various US censorship boards, which he felt Hollywood studios would be wise to avoid. He called this list "the formula" but it was popularly known as the "don'ts and be carefuls" list. In 1930, Hays created the Studio Relations Committee (SRC) to implement his censorship code, but the SRC lacked any real enforcement capability.

The advent of talking pictures in 1927 led to a perceived need for further enforcement. Martin Quigley, the publisher of a Chicago-based motion picture trade newspaper, began lobbying for a more extensive code that not only listed material that was inappropriate for the movies, but also contained a moral system that the movies could help to promote – specifically, a system based on Catholic theology. He recruited Father Daniel Lord, a Jesuit priest and instructor at the Catholic St. Louis University, to write such a code and on March 31, 1930, the board of directors of the Motion Picture Producers and Distributors Association adopted it formally. This original version especially was once popularly known as the Hays Code, but it and its later revisions are now commonly called the Production Code.

However, Depression economics and changing social mores resulted in the studios producing racier fare that the Code, lacking an aggressive enforcement body, was unable to redress. This era is known as Pre-Code Hollywood.

An amendment to the Code, adopted on June 13, 1934, established the Production Code Administration (PCA), and required all films released on or after July 1, 1934, to obtain a certificate of approval before being released. For more than thirty years following, virtually all motion pictures produced in the United States and released by major studios adhered to the code. The Production Code was not created or enforced by federal, state, or city government. In fact, the Hollywood studios adopted the code in large part in the hopes of avoiding government censorship, preferring self-regulation to government regulation.

The enforcement of the Production Code led to the dissolution of many local censorship boards. Meanwhile, the US Customs Department prohibited the importation of the Czech film Ecstasy (1933), starring an actress soon to be known as Hedy Lamarr, an action which was upheld on appeal.

In 1934, Joseph I. Breen (1888–1965) was appointed head of the new Production Code Administration (PCA). Under Breen's leadership of the PCA, which lasted until his retirement in 1954, enforcement of the Production Code became rigid and notorious. Breen's power to change scripts and scenes angered many writers, directors, and Hollywood moguls. The PCA had two offices, one in Hollywood, and the other in New York City. Films approved by the New York PCA office were issued certificate numbers that began with a zero.

The first major instance of censorship under the Production Code involved the 1934 film Tarzan and His Mate, in which brief nude scenes involving a body double for actress Maureen O'Sullivan were edited out of the master negative of the film. Another famous case of enforcement involved the 1943 western The Outlaw, produced by Howard Hughes. The Outlaw was denied a certificate of approval and kept out of theaters for years because the film's advertising focused particular attention on Jane Russell's breasts. Hughes eventually persuaded Breen that the breasts did not violate the code and the film could be shown.

Some films produced outside the mainstream studio system during this time did flout the conventions of the code, such as Child Bride (1938), which featured a nude scene involving 12-year-old actress Shirley Mills. Even cartoon sex symbol Betty Boop had to change from being a flapper, and began to wear an old-fashioned housewife skirt.

In 1952, in the case of Joseph Burstyn, Inc. v. Wilson, the U.S. Supreme Court unanimously overruled its 1915 decision and held that motion pictures were entitled to First Amendment protection, so that the New York State Board of Regents could not ban "The Miracle", a short film that was one half of L'Amore (1948), an anthology film directed by Roberto Rossellini. Film distributor Joseph Burstyn released the film in the U.S. in 1950, and the case became known as the "Miracle Decision" due to its connection to Rossellini's film. That in turn reduced the threat of government regulation that justified the Production Code, and the PCA's powers over the Hollywood industry were greatly reduced.

At the forefront of challenges to the code was director Otto Preminger, whose films violated the code repeatedly in the 1950s. His 1953 film The Moon is Blue, about a young woman who tries to play two suitors off against each other by claiming that she plans to keep her virginity until marriage, was the first film to use the words "virgin", "seduce", and "mistress", and it was released without a certificate of approval. He later made The Man with the Golden Arm (1955), which portrayed the prohibited subject of drug abuse, and Anatomy of a Murder (1959) which dealt with rape. Preminger's films were direct assaults on the authority of the Production Code and, since they were successful, hastened its abandonment.

In 1954, Joseph Breen retired and Geoffrey Shurlock was appointed as his successor. Variety noted "a decided tendency towards a broader, more casual approach" in the enforcement of the code.

Billy Wilder's Some Like It Hot (1959) and Alfred Hitchcock's Psycho (1960) were also released without a certificate of approval due to their themes and became box office hits, and as a result further weakened the authority of the code.

==== The Pawnbroker and the end of the Code ====
In the early 1960s, British films such as Victim (1961), A Taste of Honey (1961), and The Leather Boys (1963) offered social commentary about gender roles and homophobia that violated the Hollywood Production Code, yet the films were still released in America. The American gay rights, civil rights, and youth movements prompted a reevaluation of the depiction of themes of race, class, gender, and sexuality that had been restricted by the Code.

In 1964, The Pawnbroker, directed by Sidney Lumet and starring Rod Steiger, was initially rejected because of two scenes in which the actresses Linda Geiser and Thelma Oliver fully expose their breasts; and a sex scene between Oliver and Jaime Sánchez, which it described as "unacceptably sex suggestive and lustful." Despite the rejection, the film's producers arranged for Allied Artists to release the film without the Production Code seal and the New York censors licensed The Pawnbroker without the cuts demanded by Code administrators. The producers also appealed the rejection to the Motion Picture Association of America.

On a 6–3 vote, the MPAA granted the film an "exception" conditional on "reduction in the length of the scenes which the Production Code Administration found unapprovable." The exception to the code was granted as a "special and unique case", and was described by The New York Times at the time as "an unprecedented move that will not, however, set a precedent." The requested reductions of nudity were minimal, and the outcome was viewed in the media as a victory for the film's producers. The Pawnbroker was the first film featuring bare breasts to receive Production Code approval. In his 2008 study of films during that era, Pictures at a Revolution, author Mark Harris wrote that the MPAA's action was "the first of a series of injuries to the Production Code that would prove fatal within three years."

When Jack Valenti became President of the MPAA in 1966, he was immediately faced with a problem regarding language in the film version of Edward Albee's play Who's Afraid of Virginia Woolf? (1966). Valenti negotiated a compromise: The word "screw" was removed, but other language, including the phrase "hump the hostess", remained. The film received Production Code approval despite having language that was clearly prohibited. The British-produced, but American-financed film Blowup (1966) presented a different problem. After the film was denied Production Code approval, MGM released it anyway, the first instance of an MPAA member company distributing a film that didn't have an approval certificate. The MPAA did not have the legal authority to prevent it.

Enforcement had become impossible, and the Production Code was abandoned entirely.

=== Internet ===
Private businesses, schools, libraries, and government offices may use filtering software to censor at their discretion, and in such cases courts have ruled that the use of such censoring software does not violate the First Amendment.

US v. ALA (2003) 539 U.S. 194 is limited to its facts. It holds only that libraries may filter internet content. The ruling does not apply to private businesses, such as internet platforms Facebook, Google, YouTube, Wikipedia, etc. See: Marsh v. Alabama (1946) 326 U.S. 501;

The U.S. Communications Decency Act of 1996 (CDA) sought to regulate pornography on the Internet, making it a crime to transmit "obscene or indecent" material to anyone under the age of 18. In 1997, the U.S. Supreme Court struck down the anti-indecency provisions of the law in Reno v. American Civil Liberties Union.

Left unaffected by the decision was Section 230, sometimes referred to as the "First Amendment of the Internet." This section is often credited with the subsequent explosion of social media. It states that, "No provider or user of an interactive computer service shall be treated as the publisher or speaker of any information provided by another information content provider."

Section 230 also shields interactive computer services from civil liability and state criminal laws for policing user-generated content, as long as it is done in "good faith." However, some critics argue that Section 230 protects platforms even if they have knowingly perpetuated harmful rhetoric. According to the Electronic Frontier Foundation (EFF), Section 230 "does not apply to federal criminal law, intellectual property law, and electronic communications privacy law."

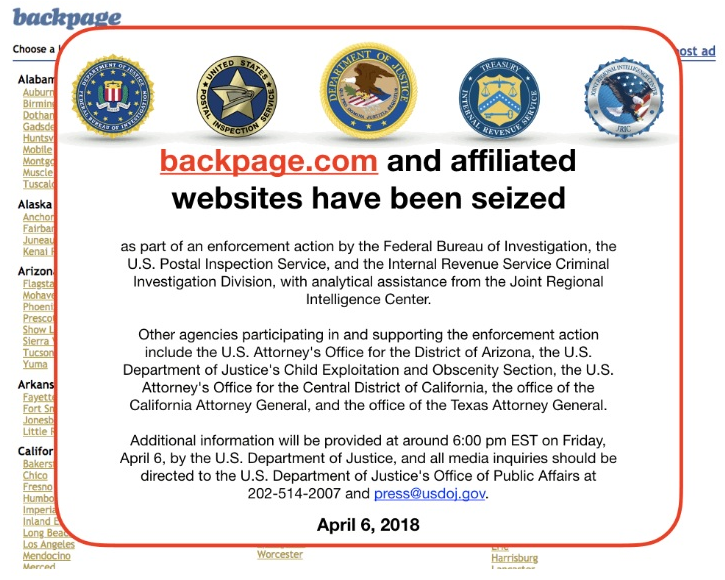
Screenshot of the webpage on April 13, 2018, following the seizure of Backpage a week earlier

In 2018, Congress passed a bill known variously as the Stop Enabling Sex Traffickers Act (SESTA), Allow States and Victims to Fight Online Sex Trafficking Act (FOSTA), or simply FOSTA/SESTA, which made it illegal for an interactive computer service either to promote or to facilitate prostitution, which could include advertisements for prostitution. It also lifted civil and state criminal immunity for the facilitation of sex trafficking.

President Trump signed FOSTA/SESTA into law on April 11, 2018. Though backers of the legislation had argued that it was necessary to go after the website Backpage.com for sex trafficking that allegedly took place on the site, the U.S. Department of Justice seized and took down the website on April 8, 2018, three days before act became law, indicting seven former owners and executives of the company in Phoenix, Arizona on 93 counts related to violations of the U.S. Travel Act.

The pertinent section of the Travel Act makes it illegal to "promote, manage, establish, carry on, or facilitate the promotion, management, establishment, or carrying on, of any unlawful activity" across state lines, including prostitution.

Critics of FOSTA/SESTA claim the law is an attack on sex workers. Some research suggests that the law has endangered sex workers and made them more vulnerable to being trafficked. Other critics say that FOSTA/SESTA led to outlets censoring themselves online for fear of being seen as promoting prostitution. The chief example given is that of Craigslist.org removing its personals section to avoid civil and criminal liability from the law.

FOSTA/SESTA was challenged on First Amendment grounds in federal court by the Woodhull Freedom Foundation and Human Rights Watch. The law was upheld by a Washington D.C. circuit court in July 2023.

In 2022, the state of Louisiana passed Act 440 requiring a government ID to access websites if more than thirty-three and one-third percent of their total material is deemed harmful to minors, which went into effect on January 1, 2023.

Since the 2024 United States presidential election, Wikipedia has more frequently been the target of political pressure by government officials in the second Trump administration, especially over allegations of antisemitism due to alleged pro-Palestinian bias during the Gaza war. In August 2025, House Republicans opened an investigation into Wikipedia, requesting unique characteristics of accounts—such as account names and IP addresses—of Wikipedia editors subject to ArbCom actions. This followed a series of actions by the government beginning in April 2025, which applied political pressure to Wikipedia after Trump-affiliated think tank the Heritage Foundation's Project Esther was noted as containing plans to dox Wikipedia editors using strategies such as phishing attacks.

=== Literature ===
Banning books is a part of American history. The first book censorship took place in the 1620s.

In August 2023, restrictions have been placed on the teaching of Shakespearean plays and literature by Florida teachers in order to comply with state law.

=== Pornography ===
U.S. courts have ruled that the First Amendment protects "indecent" pornography from regulation, but not "obscene" pornography. People convicted of distributing obscene pornography face long prison terms and asset forfeiture. However, in State v. Henry (1987), the Oregon Supreme Court ruled that obscenity was an unconstitutional restriction of free speech under the free speech provision of the Oregon Constitution and abolished the offense of obscenity in that state, although it remains an offense on the federal level.

In 1996, the Congress passed the Communications Decency Act, with the aim of restricting Internet pornography. However, court rulings later struck down many provisions of the law.

In 1994, Mike Diana became the first American artist to receive a conviction for obscenity for drawing cartoons that were judged legally obscene.

Child pornography is unlawful in the United States. The U.S. Supreme Court has held that it is not protected by the First Amendment, and even if not obscene, it is not considered protected speech, according to New York v. Ferber. In Ashcroft v. Free Speech Coalition, 535 U.S. 234 (2002), however, the Supreme Court held that child pornography that is produced without using an actual minor (computer-generated images, for example) is protected by the First Amendment if not found to be obscene. Nevertheless, the federal PROTECT Act of 2003 provides that any realistic-appearing computer-generated depiction that is indistinguishable from a depiction of an actual minor in sexual situations or engaging in sexual acts is illegal under 18 U.S.C. § 2252A.

In 2025, Michigan's proposal named Anti-Corruption of Public Morals Act was introduced to criminalize pornography content online, along with transgender-related content and VPNs in Michigan, with up to 20 years in prison and a fine of $100,000 or both and 25 years in prison and a fine of $125,000 or both if a defendant has more than 100 pieces.

== Governmental ==
=== National Security ===
==== Information leaks ====
WikiLeaks became the subject of censorship by the federal government and Amazon.com.

Since WikiLeaks' inception, the topic of censorship has been widely discussed. As a non-profit media organization that strives to create more transparency in the government, WikiLeaks releases sensitive files and information to the public. Amazon.com removed WikiLeaks from its servers on 1 December 2010. U.S. Senator Joe Lieberman, among the members of the U.S. Senate Homeland Security and Governmental Affairs Committee who had questioned Amazon in private communication on the company's hosting of WikiLeaks and the illegally obtained documents, commended Amazon for the action. Assange said that WikiLeaks chose Amazon and other hosts knowing it would probably be kicked off the service "in order to separate rhetoric from reality".

Official efforts by the U.S. government to limit federal employee's access to and conversation about the cables leaked by WikiLeaks were revealed by leading media organizations. According to a 3 December 2010 article in The Guardian, access to WikiLeaks has been blocked for federal workers. The U.S. Library of Congress, the U.S. Commerce Department and other government agencies have confirmed that the ban is already in place. Some Department of Homeland Security staff say the ban is hampering their work: "More damage will be done by keeping the federal workforce largely in the dark about what other interested parties worldwide are going to be reading and analyzing." One official says that the ban apparently covers personal computers as well.

A spokesman for Columbia University confirmed on 4 December that its Office of Career Services sent an e-mail warning students at Columbia's School of International and Public Affairs to refrain from accessing WikiLeaks cables and discussing this subject on the grounds that "discourse about the documents would call into question your ability to deal with confidential information." However, this was quickly retracted on the following day. SIPA Dean John Henry Coatsworth wrote that "Freedom of information and expression is a core value of our institution, ... thus, SIPA's position is that students have a right to discuss and debate any information in the public arena that they deem relevant to their studies or to their roles as global citizens, and to do so without fear of adverse consequences."

The New York Times reported on 14 December 2010 that the U.S. Air Force bars its personnel from access to news sites (such as those of The New York Times and The Guardian, Le Monde, El País, and Der Spiegel) that publish leaked cables.

On 18 December 2010, the Bank of America stopped handling payments for WikiLeaks. Bank of America is also blocking access to WikiLeaks from its internal network preventing employees from accessing WikiLeaks.

The Monterey Herald reported on June 27, 2013, that the United States Army bars its personnel from access to parts of the website of The Guardian after their revelations of whistleblower Edward Snowden's information about global surveillance. The entire Guardian website is blocked for personnel stationed throughout Afghanistan, the Middle East, and South Asia.

==== Technology ====
The export of cryptography software is regulated as a munition under the International Traffic in Arms Regulations, although in recent years the regulations have relaxed, due in part to industry lobbying.

In 1995, Daniel J. Bernstein challenged the regulations (see Bernstein v. United States) on First Amendment grounds. The Ninth Circuit Court of Appeals ruled that software source code was speech protected by the First Amendment and that the government's regulations preventing its publication were unconstitutional. However, some regulations remain.

==== War on Terrorism ====
The NSA electronic surveillance program and DARPA's Total Information Awareness were two examples of post–September 11 government monitoring programs. Though intended to target terrorist behavior, critics worried fears about government monitoring might lead people to self-censorship.

A controversy also erupted concerning National Security Letters, issued by the federal government and not subject to prior judicial review. These letters demanded information the government asserted was relevant to a terrorism investigation, but also contained a gag order preventing recipients from revealing the existence of the letter. Critics contend this prevents public oversight of government investigations, and allows unreasonable search and seizure to go unchecked. The American Civil Liberties Union complained that Section 505 of the USA PATRIOT Act removed the need for the government to connect recipients to a terrorism investigation, widening the possibility for abuse. On November 7, 2005, the American Civil Liberties Union (ACLU) reported:

According to the Washington Post, universities and casinos have received these letters and been forced to comply with the demands to turn over private student and customer information. Anyone who receives an NSL is gagged - forever - from telling anyone that the FBI demanded records, even if their identity has already been made public. In New York and Connecticut, the ACLU has challenged the NSL provision that was dramatically expanded by Section 505 of the Patriot Act. The legislation amended the existing NSL power by permitting the FBI to demand records of people who are not connected to terrorism and who are not suspected of any wrongdoing.

On February 17, 2006, former U.S. Secretary of Defense Donald Rumsfeld stated, that:

in this war, some of the most critical battles may not be fought in the mountains of Afghanistan or the streets of Iraq, but in the newsrooms in places like New York and London and Cairo and elsewhere. ... While the enemy is increasingly skillful at manipulating the media and using the tools of communications to their advantage, it should be noted that we have an advantage as well, and that is, quite simply, that the truth is on our side, and ultimately, in my view, truth wins out. I believe with every bone in my body that free people, exposed to sufficient information, will, over time, find their way to right decisions.

The Protect America Act of 2007 was also controversial for its lack of judicial review.

The war on terrorism also affects US policy towards journalists in other states. In 2011, U.S. President Barack Obama asked Yemeni President Ali Abdullah Saleh to stop the release of journalist Abdulelah Haider Shaye, who reported U.S. involvement in the bombings.

==== Weapons ====
On March 15, 1950, Scientific American published an article by Hans Bethe about thermonuclear fusion, but the United States Atomic Energy Commission successfully ordered printed copies of the magazine destroyed, and a redacted version was published. The censorship was not disputed by Bethe.

Under the Invention Secrecy Act of 1951 and the Atomic Energy Act of 1954, patents may be withheld and kept secret on grounds of national security.

In 1979, the magazine The Progressive was sued by the U.S. government (United States v. The Progressive) and temporarily blocked from publishing an article that purported to reveal the "secret" of the hydrogen bomb. The article was eventually published after Fusion magazine, published by the Fusion Energy Foundation, published similar information and the government dropped the charges.

In 1997, Congress voted unanimously to add an amendment to a Department of Defense spending bill (known as the Feinstien amendment) forbidding the distribution of instructions that teach "the making or use of an explosive, a destructive device, or a weapon of mass destruction" if those instructions are intended to assist in the actual building and use of such a device.

=== Political ===
In 1987, an article appeared in The Scientist which alleged that the U.S. government improperly suppressed two science magazines put out by the Fusion Energy Foundation. The article quotes scientists Winston Bostick, who said that "the Department of Justice wants to crush the magazines before they publish information which could send quite a few officials of the department to jail," and former Department of Energy official Stephen Dean, who said that the government's actions were "a gross abuse of the legal system—a violation of due process."

Under Florida Governor Rick Scott, the usage of the term 'climate change' was limited in state government publications.

In May 2020 during the George Floyd protests, CNN reporter Omar Jimenez and camera crew were arrested by Minnesota State Patrol officers as Jimenez reported live on television. Jimenez identified himself and the crew as journalists. The police officers stated that the news crew did not follow orders and detained them. CNN released a statement saying that the arrest violated the First Amendment rights of the reporters, and calling for their immediate release. The crew were released later that day, after an intervention from the Governor of Minnesota, Tim Walz.

In 2024, Facebook CEO Mark Zuckerberg claimed the Joe Biden administration had "repeatedly pressured" the company to "censor" certain content about COVID-19, including humor and satire. In 2025, YouTube also stated that the administration had pressured them to remove claims about COVID-19 and the 2020 United States presidential election, including misinformation, which did not explicitly violate platform rules.

==== Ban on material support for foreign boycotts ====
A law passed by the U.S. Congress in 1977 penalizes all U.S. persons, defined to include individuals and companies located in the United States and their foreign affiliates, from supporting the boycott of Israel and provides penalties for those who willingly comply with the boycott. The B.I.S. website states:

Conduct that may be penalized under the TRA and/or prohibited under the EAR includes:

- Agreements to refuse or actual refusal to do business with or in Israel or with blacklisted companies.
- Agreements to discriminate or actual discrimination against other persons based on race, religion, sex, national origin or nationality.
- Agreements to furnish or actual furnishing of information about business relationships with or in Israel or with blacklisted companies.
- Agreements to furnish or actual furnishing of information about the race, religion, sex, or national origin of another person.

Implementing letters of credit containing prohibited boycott terms or conditions.

The TRA does not "prohibit" conduct, but denies tax benefits ("penalizes") for certain types of boycott-related agreements.

On this basis, some American businesses have been punished for answering their customers' question about origin of their products.

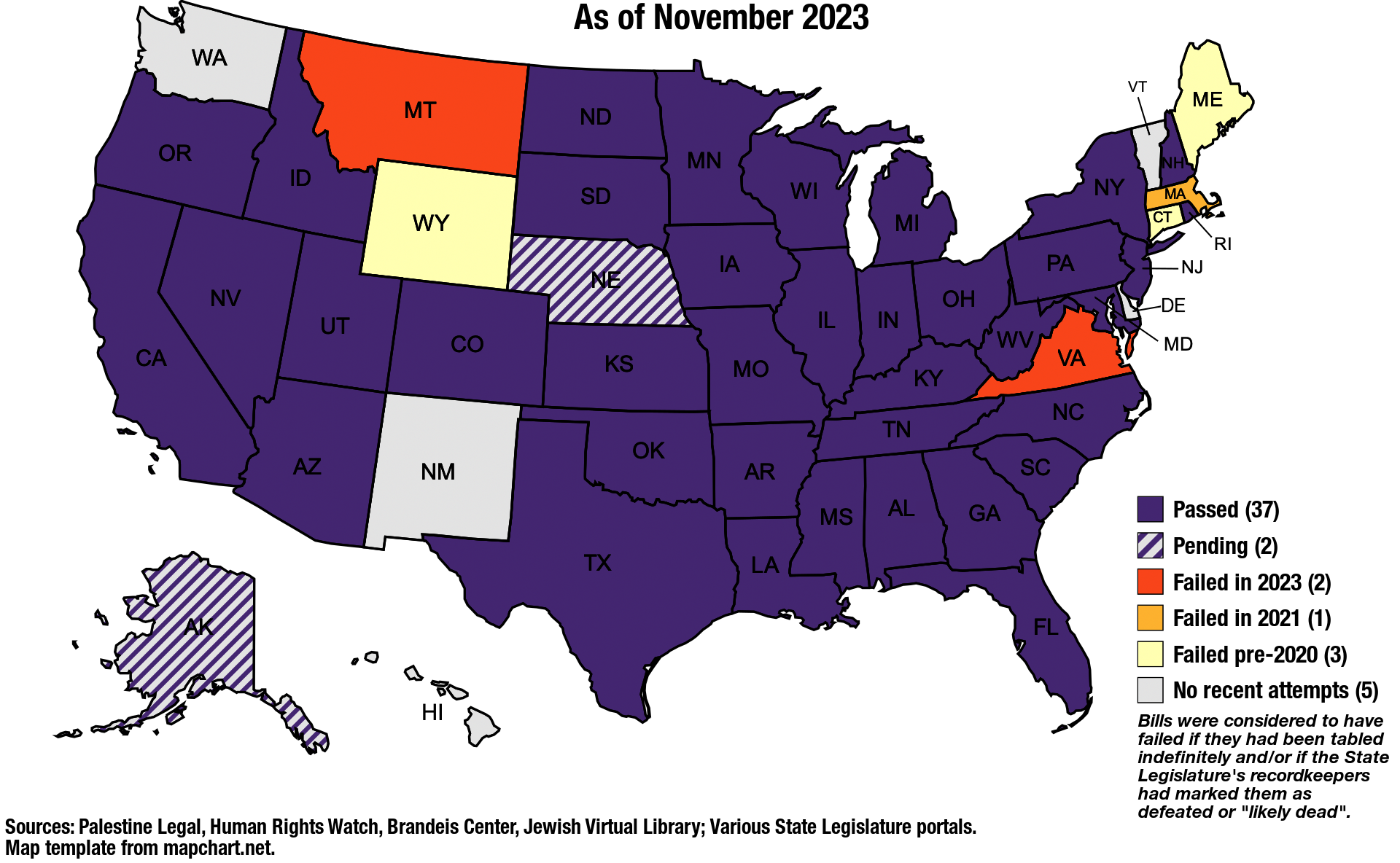
Map showing U.S. states where anti-BDS legislation has passed, is pending, or has failed as of November 2023

Some pro-Israeli activists have construed the law as forbidding speech and expression that supports any boycott of Israel (as opposed to actions taken to comply with the requests of foreign entities to boycott Israel) whether foreign in origin or domestic, and asked the US Anti-Boycott Office to prosecute divestment campaigners against Israel.

However, the law only forbids material participation in or material support of a boycott originated by a foreign nation or organization, not with a domestic boycott campaign, nor can the law be construed as forbidding speech that politically or morally (as opposed to materially) supports any boycott, whether foreign, or domestic. The law only prevents US organizations from being used by alien entities as agents of their foreign policy, when that foreign policy includes the pursuit of boycotting arrangements; it does not prevent US organizations or individuals from choosing how to spend or invest their money based on business or ethical considerations; it only forbids doing so as the result of a foreign entity's request. Material attempts to suppress speech through induction of state action under false pretenses, such as by claiming a domestic boycott campaign is foreign in origin may be unlawful, and may constitute conspiracy against civil rights, a federal crime, punishable by fine and imprisonment. (Such speech is considered to be core political speech under the US Constitution, and any state actions interfering with core political speech are subject to the strictest Constitutional scrutiny.)

Opponents of anti-BDS laws claim that Israel and its supporters are engaging in lawfare by lobbying for anti-BDS laws that infringe upon the right to free speech.

=== Scientific ===
==== Vaccination ====
Government efforts to curtail speech encouraging resistance to government vaccination mandates are illustrated by a Chicago City lawsuit against police union president John Catanzara and the Cook County Circuit judges ruling on October 15, 2021, "I think that the City has alleged a public interest in precluding Mr. Catanzara from making further comments encouraging his members to refuse to comply with the City's policies so for that reason, I'll enter a temporary restraining order requiring that Mr. Catanzara be precluded from making additional public comments."

==== LGBTQ ====
Following executive orders by Donald Trump, federal institutions were ordered to remove all language related to gender identity. This led to a large number of federal websites, especially those belonging to the CDC, being taken down. The CDC also ordered its scientists to retract any not yet published research they had produced which included any of the following banned terms: "Gender, transgender, pregnant person, pregnant people, LGBT, transsexual, non-binary, nonbinary, assigned male at birth, assigned female at birth, biologically male, biologically female”. Other censored topics include DEI, climate change, and HIV.

Following extensive public backlash, some, but not all, of the removed pages were reinstated. CDC's censorship led to many researchers and journalists to preserve databases themselves, with many removed articles being uploaded to archival sites such as the Internet Archive.

==== NSF Funding ====
Following executive orders by Donald Trump, the National Science Foundation began withholding research grants for science projects that contained words such as "women", "disability", "oppression", "minority", and "gender" among others. This came among many others orders that targeted federal minority representation.

==== Scientific Open Hardware ====
Scientists have generally embraced the concept of applying open source principles to hardware to improve scientific equipment performance as well as to reduce costs. With digital manufacturing tools, U.S. government scientists at the National Institutes of Health explained 3D printing lab equipment maximizes the use of time and funding. Based on a review of published open hardware for science, on average open source technologies provide economic savings of 87% compared to equivalent or lesser performing proprietary tools. More recently the FDA, used open hardware during the COVID 19 pandemic to accelerate distributed manufacturing of open hardware medical and scientific tools as well as PPE. In 2026, however, the Bureau Approving Officials (BAOs) across various U.S. federal agencies, demanded redactions of U.S. government scientists' articles prior to peer-review that target bill of materials and language that officials fear could be construed as “endorsement, disparagement, or competition with the private sector.” This is counter to general rules of open hardware equipment design journals and Elsevier pointed out, such censorship was against the best interests of the U.S. government and U.S. policies regarding open science.

== Corporate ==
In 1969 Nicholas Johnson, United States Federal Communications Commission (FCC) commissioner, put forward in an article in TV Guide entitled The Silent Screen that "Censorship is a serious problem" in the United States, and that he agreed with the statements by various network officials that television was subject to it, but disputed "just who is doing most of the censoring." He stated that most television censorship is corporate censorship, not government censorship.

Croteau and Hoynes discuss corporate censorship in the news publishing business, observing that it can occur as self-censorship. They note that it is "virtually impossible to document" because it is covert. Jonathan Alter states that "In a tight job market, the tendency is to avoid getting yourself or your boss in trouble. So an adjective gets dropped, a story skipped, a punch pulled ... It's like that Sherlock Holmes story – the dog that didn't bark. Those clues are hard to find." The head of the Media Access Project notes that such self-censorship is not misreporting or false reporting, but simply not reporting at all. The self-censorship is not the product of "dramatic conspiracies", according to Croteau and Hoynes, but simply the interaction of many small daily decisions. Journalists want to keep their jobs. Editors support the interests of the company. These many small actions and inactions accumulate to produce (in their words) "homogenized, corporate-friendly media." Croteau and Hoynes report that such corporate censorship in journalism is commonplace, reporting the results of studies revealing that more than 40% of journalists and news executives stating that they had deliberately engaged in such censorship by avoiding newsworthy stories or softening the tones of stories.

Nichols and McChesney opine that "the maniacal media baron as portrayed in James Bond films or profiles of Rupert Murdoch is far less a danger than the cautious and compromised editor who seeks to 'balance' a responsibility to readers or viewers with a duty to serve his boss and the advertisers." They state that "even among journalists who entered the field for the noblest of reasons" there is a tendency to avoid any controversial journalism that might embroil the news company in a battle with a powerful corporation or a government agency.

=== Self-censorship ===
Self-censorship is not the only form of corporate censorship in the news and entertainment businesses. Croteau and Hoynes also describe examples of managers censoring their employees, subdivisions of conglomerates applying pressure upon one another, and pressure applied upon corporations by external entities such as advertisers.

One of the incidents of corporate censorship that Croteau and Hoynes find to be "the most disturbing" in their view is the news reporting in the U.S. of the Telecommunications Act of 1996, which made fundamental changes to the limitations on ownership of media conglomerates within the U.S. and which was heavily lobbied for by media interests, and yet which was subject to, in Croteau and Hoyne's words, "remarkably little coverage" by U.S. news media.

== Law ==
The First Amendment to the United States Constitution stipulates that Congress cannot make laws abridging "the freedom of speech, or of the press." Many federal laws nonetheless do so. Types of speech which can either be totally or partially abridged include perjury, fraud, obscenity, and defamation.

=== Copyright ===
The United States has strong copyright laws, which result in the inability to republish copyrighted material without permission from the copyright owner, subject to criminal and civil penalties, though works that were published before January 1, 1928, are in the public domain.

==== Digital Millennium Copyright Act ====
The Digital Millennium Copyright Act (DMCA) is an extension to United States copyright law passed unanimously on May 14, 1998, which criminalizes the production and dissemination of technology that allows users to circumvent technical copy-restriction methods. Under the Act, circumvention of a technological measure that effectively controls access to a work is illegal if done with the primary intent of violating the rights of copyright holders.

Although the Act contains an exception for research, the DMCA has affected the worldwide cryptography research community, because many fear that their cryptanalytic research violates, or might be construed to violate the law. The arrest of Russian programmer Dmitry Sklyarov in 2001, for alleged infringement of the DMCA, was a highly publicized example of the law's use to prevent or penalize development of anti-digital rights management measures. Sklyarov was arrested in the United States after a presentation at DEF CON, and subsequently spent several months in jail. The DMCA has also been cited as chilling to non-criminal inclined users, such as students of cryptanalysis (including, in a well-known instance, Professor Felten and students at Princeton), and security consultants such as the Netherlands-based Niels Ferguson, who has declined to publish information about vulnerabilities he discovered in an Intel secure-computing scheme because of his concern about being arrested under the DMCA when he travels to the United States.

Free speech lawsuits have resulted surrounding the publication of DeCSS and the AACS encryption key, both dealing with the "cracking" of copy-protected movies (on DVD and Blu-ray Disc/HD DVD, respectively).

=== Freedom of speech ===
==== Free speech zone ====
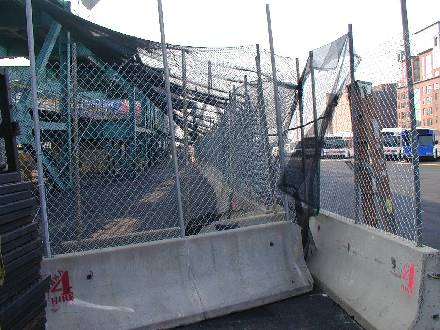
The free speech zone organized by the local government in Boston, during the 2004 Democratic National Convention

Free speech zones (also known as First Amendment Zones, Free speech cages, and Protest zones) are areas set aside in public places for citizens of the United States engaged in political activism to exercise their right of free speech. The First Amendment to the United States Constitution states that "Congress shall make no law... abridging... the right of the people peaceably to assemble, and to petition the Government for a redress of grievances." The existence of free speech zones is based on court decisions that stipulate the government may regulate the time, place, and manner – but not content – of expression. TPM restrictions, as these are known, are only lawful when:

- they treat all speech equally – for example, persons on all sides of an issue must be treated the same;
- they are justified by a substantial, bona-fide public interest, such as crowd control;
- they do not substantively impede or dilute the speech at hand;
- there is no bad faith; there is no overt or ulterior motive by the authorities imposing a TPM restriction to suppress speech in general, or speech that they disagree with, in particular.

All TPM restrictions are subject to judicial review. Unreasonable and unconstitutional TPM restrictions are and have been repeatedly vacated by various courts, and/or subjected to injunction, restraining order, and consent decree. Unconstitutional TPM restrictions allow citizens whose freedom of speech has been violated to personally sue state agents acting under color of law responsible for the violations at hand in their individual capacity, e.g. as private citizens, stripping them of any official capacity defense or defenses of sovereign immunity. TPM restrictions related to core political speech are subject to the highest possible level of Constitutional scrutiny.

Free speech zones have been used at a variety of political gatherings. The stated purpose of free speech zones is to protect the safety of those attending the political gathering, or for the safety of the protesters themselves. Critics, however, suggest that such zones are "Orwellian", and that authorities use them in a heavy-handed manner to censor protesters by putting them literally out of sight of the mass media, hence the public, as well as visiting dignitaries. Though authorities generally deny specifically targeting protesters, on a number of occasions, these denials have been contradicted by subsequent court testimony. The American Civil Liberties Union (ACLU) has filed a number of lawsuits on the issue.

The most prominent examples are those created by the United States Secret Service for President George W. Bush and other members of his administration. While free speech zones existed in limited forms prior to the Presidency of George W. Bush, it has been during Bush's presidency that their scope has been greatly expanded. Free speech zones are and have been used in the past and in the present by institutions of higher education in the United States, which has led to organizations like the ACLU and the Foundation for Individual Rights in Education (FIRE) to object to these as infringements of freedom of speech, and of academic freedom.

=== Libel ===
Libel and slander are generally considered civil wrongs which can constitute the basis of a private lawsuit. However, as of 2019, criminal libel laws are on the books in twenty-four states. Each of them makes an arrest about once per year on average. In 2018, the American Civil Liberties Union sued one such state, New Hampshire after Exeter resident Robert Frese was arrested for insulting two police officers on Facebook. His comment called the police chief "a coward" and stated that his most recent traffic citation had been issued by "a dirty cop." The case against Frese was later dropped.

Since the 1964 decision in New York Times Co. v. Sullivan, public figures like entertainers and politicians must prove actual malice was intended as opposed to simple negligence to win a libel or slander suit. For instance, public officials cannot file a lawsuit if someone makes a caricature of them or insults them.

Although it is difficult to win a libel case in the United States, it can still be an effective means of intimidation and deterrence, since defending oneself against a lawsuit is expensive and time-consuming.

Persons engaged in legislative debate in Congress are granted complete immunity from libel and slander suits so long as they are speaking from the floor of the Senate or House of Representatives.

=== Local censorship ===
Until Gitlow v. New York in 1925, the First Amendment was held not to apply to states and municipalities. Entities without any prohibition in their own charters were free to censor newspapers, magazines, books, plays, movies, comedy shows, and so on, as exemplified by the phrase "banned in Boston." Despite this decision, censorship continued under this additional First Amendment scrutiny into the 1950s and 1960s.

In New York, litigation on a local ban upon the book Ulysses by James Joyce in 1933 played a pivotal role in an eventual set of rules determining what is and is not obscene. The standard of the effect upon "l'homme moyen sensuel" (the reasonable person), when reading or viewing of material, became the legal standard. The ruling instructed the Court to not consider the impression of the "little old lady" or most "pious member of the community" rather to the general community as a whole. The book's publisher, despite only receiving a ruling in New York, took the risk of publishing the book nationally despite local bans still being in place. The publisher reasoned the ruling in New York would be seen by local efforts to ban books as protection.

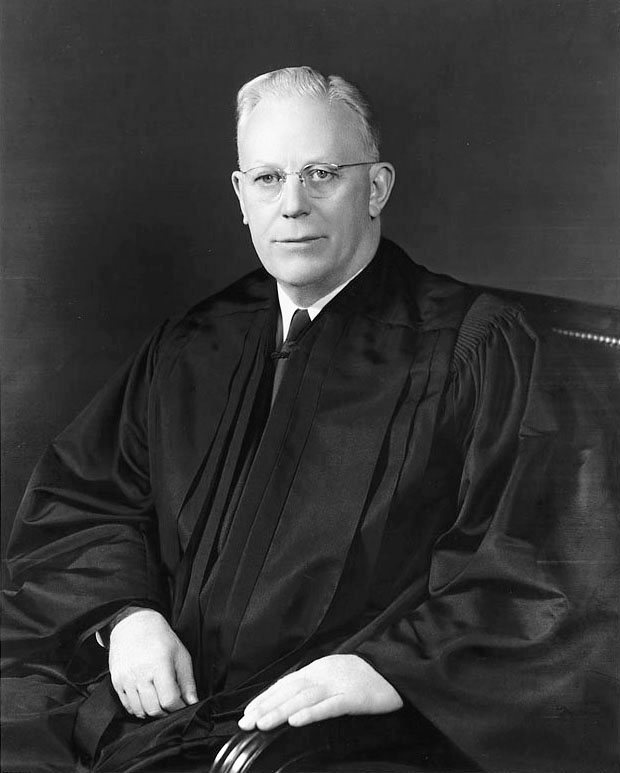
Earl Warren, Chief Justice of the United States Supreme Court from October 5, 1953 – June 23, 1969

The free speech decisions of the United States Supreme Court under Chief Justice Earl Warren, which served from 1953 to 1969, extended the protections of the First Amendment to state and local government and applied stricter standards of review for what government actions were acceptable.

The state of Maryland retained its movie ratings board an unusually long time, abandoning it in the 1980s in favor of the private MPAA's voluntary ratings scheme.

In 2017, California prosecutors interpreted hateful posts on the Facebook page of the Islamic Center of Southern California as a violation of the California Penal Code. The provision criminalizing "repeated contact ... with intent to annoy or harass" was used to charge Mark Feigin who was previously suspected of making a death threat to the center by telephone. Although the LAPD later recommended charges against a different caller, CNN reported that "in the criminal complaint against [Feigin], the Facebook posts, which Det. Bryant repeatedly told Feigin were not criminal in nature, have replaced that phone call and another one made in 2015 that also was falsely attributed to him."

In 2019, two friends at the University of Connecticut were heard taunting each other with offensive words including "nigger." They were subsequently arrested and charged under Title 53 of the Connecticut General Statutes. The relevant section, which criminalizes "ridicule on account of creed, religion, color, denomination, nationality or race" was described as unconstitutional by law professor Steve Sanders.

In 2021, left wing podcaster Ryan Wentz made a tweet which criticized Alexandria Ocasio-Cortez based on a comment she had made about Israel and Palestine. Wentz subsequently received a visit from police officers who accused him of making threats against Ocasio-Cortez. Capitol police later revealed that they had acted alone in alerting the California Highway Patrol due to a different person's tweet which had simply tagged Wentz. Wentz subsequently called on Ocasio-Cortez "to publicly condemn the draconian security measures that were carried out in her name."

Following the overturning of Roe v. Wade in 2022, several Republican state legislatures began introducing bills written by the National Right to Life Committee which criminalize the dissemination of information on how to obtain an abortion. The Mississippi Attorney General also sought an injunction against Mayday Health, an organization known for running a pro-choice billboard campaign in Jackson, Mississippi.

=== Judicial orders ===
Individual judges have the power to order parties in their jurisdictions not to disclose certain information. A gag order might be issued to prevent someone from disclosing information that would interfere with an ongoing court case. Though court documents are generally public information, record sealing is sometimes used to prevent sensitive information (such as personal information, information about minors, or classified information) exposed by a court case from becoming public.

Such powers are subject to strict review by higher courts, and generally have been narrow compared to countries such as the United Kingdom and Canada.

The 1971 case Nebraska Press Assn. v. Stuart, established a high standard that must be met for courts to prevent media organizations from publishing information about an ongoing trial to preserve the defendant's right to a fair trial.

On January 4, 2007, US District Court Judge Jack B. Weinstein issued a temporary restraining order forbidding a number of activists and their organizations in the psychiatric survivors movement, including MindFreedom International and the Alliance for Human Research Protection from disseminating ostensibly leaked documents purporting to show that Eli Lilly and Company knowingly concealed information on potentially lethal side-effects of Zyprexa for years. The "Zyprexa documents" had been sealed by an earlier court order in a mass tort case; they were widely disseminated after Alaska attorney James Gottstein issued a subpoena for them in an unrelated case. The Electronic Frontier Foundation came to the defense of one of the parties silenced by the restraining order to defend the First Amendment right of Internet journalists to post links to relevant documents on wikis, blogs, and other web pages. While Eli Lilly maintains that the documents were obtained unlawfully and should not be part of the public domain, critics cite the leaked Pentagon Papers as precedent for the right of individuals to report on the existence and contents of such documents, and in this particular case, maintain that court sealing of documents should never be allowed to protect individuals or corporations from criminal liability.

=== Prior restraint ===
The 1931 Near v. Minnesota case was the first to establish the doctrine that prior restraint was in most cases unconstitutional. Prior restraint is censorship which prevents material from being published in the first place. The alternative form of censorship occurs as punishment for unlawful or harmful material already published, usually after having the opportunity to dispute the charge in court.

=== Sedition ===
There have been a number of attempts in the United States to forbid speech that has been deemed "seditious." In 1798, President John Adams signed into law the Alien and Sedition Acts, the fourth of which, the Sedition Act or "An Act for the Punishment of Certain Crimes against the United States" set out punishments of up to two years' imprisonment for "opposing or resisting any law of the United States" or writing or publishing "false, scandalous, and malicious writing" about the President or Congress (but specifically not the Vice-president). The act was allowed to expire in 1801 after the election of Thomas Jefferson, Vice President at the time of the Act's passage.

The Sedition Act of 1918, an extension of the Espionage Act of 1917 which had passed in connection with the United States joining the Allied Powers in the First World War, was a controversial law that led to imprisonment of many prominent individuals for opposing the war or the draft. State laws prohibiting "sedition" were also passed and used to prosecute and persecute alleged "seditionists" during this period, including many people guilty only of being "Wobblies", or members of the Industrial Workers of the World. In Schenck v. United States, the Supreme Court upheld the Espionage Act and banned speaking against the draft during World War I. This case led to the "clear and present danger" test. In 1969, Brandenburg v. Ohio established the "imminent lawless action" test. State sedition acts, if in place, are likely unconstitutional under the Brandenburg doctrine of "imminent lawless action" or the older doctrine of "clear and present danger."

=== Smith Act ===
The Alien Registration Act or Smith Act (18 U.S.C. § 2385) of 1940 is a United States federal statute that made it a criminal offense for anyone to

knowingly or willfully advocate, abet, advise or teach the duty, necessity, desirability or propriety of overthrowing the Government of the United States or of any State by force or violence, or for anyone to organize any association which teaches, advises or encourages such an overthrow, or for anyone to become a member of or to affiliate with any such association.

It also required all non-citizen adult residents to register with the government; within four months, 4,741,971 non-citizens had registered under the Act's provisions.

The Act is best known for its use against political organizations and figures, mostly on the left. From 1941 to 1957, hundreds of socialists were prosecuted under the Smith Act. The first trial, in 1941, focused on Trotskyists, the second trial in 1944 prosecuted alleged fascists and, beginning in 1949, leaders and members of the Communist Party USA were targeted. Prosecutions continued until a series of Supreme Court decisions in 1957 threw out numerous convictions under the Smith Act as unconstitutional. The statute itself, often amended, has not been repealed.

== See also ==
- Civil liberties in the United States
- Timeline of government attacks on journalists in the United States
  - Government attacks on journalists during the Trump presidencies
- First Amendment to the United States Constitution
- Freedom of speech in the United States
- Press freedom in the United States
- List of cases argued by Floyd Abrams
- List of most commonly challenged books in the United States
- Mass surveillance in the United States
- Media coverage of climate change
- Media bias in the United States
- Political correctness
- Prior restraint
- Surveillance
  - Computer surveillance
- United States defamation law
- United States obscenity law
- Westmoreland v. CBS

Documentary films

- This Film Is Not Yet Rated (2006)

Censorship in the past

- Alien and Sedition Acts, 1798
- Comstock Act of 1873
- Red Scare, 1919
- Hays Code (Hollywood Production Code), 1934 to 1968

Rating systems and industry self-regulation

- Comics Code Authority
- Entertainment Software Rating Board (ESRB)
- MPAA film rating system
- Parental Advisory (music)
- TV Parental Guidelines

Related techniques of suppression

- Media manipulation
- Propaganda
- Slander and libel

Free speech advocates

- American Civil Liberties Union
- American Library Association
- Center for Democracy and Technology
- Electronic Frontier Foundation
- Fans of X-Rated Entertainment
- Free Speech Coalition
- Index on Censorship
- International Freedom of Expression Exchange
- National Coalition Against Censorship

Organizations advocating censorship

- New York Society for the Suppression of Vice
- National Center on Sexual Exploitation, formerly Morality in Media

Surveillance by the United States government

- 2013 mass surveillance disclosures, reports about NSA and its international partners' mass surveillance of foreign nationals and U.S. citizens
- Carnivore, a U.S. Federal Bureau of Investigation system to monitor email and electronic communications
- Computer and Internet Protocol Address Verifier (CIPAV), a data gathering tool used by the U.S. Federal Bureau of Investigation (FBI)
- Dropmire, a secret surveillance program by the NSA aimed at surveillance of foreign embassies and diplomatic staff, including those of NATO allies
- Magic Lantern, keystroke logging software developed by the U.S. Federal Bureau of Investigation
- NSA call database, a database containing metadata for hundreds of billions of telephone calls made in the U.S.
- NSA warrantless surveillance (2001–07)
- NSA whistleblowers: William Binney, Thomas Andrews Drake, Mark Klein, Thomas Tamm, Russ Tice, Edward Snowden
- Spying on United Nations leaders by United States diplomats
- Stellar Wind, code name for information collected under the President's Surveillance Program
- Terrorist Surveillance Program, an NSA electronic surveillance program
- Total Information Awareness, a project of the Defense Advanced Research Projects Agency (DARPA)
