= Computer and network surveillance =

Monitoring of computer or network activity

Computer and network surveillance is the monitoring of computer activity and data stored locally on a computer or data being transferred over computer networks such as the Internet. This monitoring is often carried out covertly and may be completed by governments, corporations, criminal organizations, or individuals. It may or may not be legal and may or may not require authorization from a court or other independent government agencies. Computer and network surveillance programs are widespread today, and almost all Internet traffic can be monitored.

Surveillance allows governments and other agencies to maintain social control, recognize and monitor threats or any suspicious or abnormal activity, and prevent and investigate criminal activities. With the advent of programs such as the Total Information Awareness program, technologies such as high-speed surveillance computers and biometrics software, and laws such as the Communications Assistance For Law Enforcement Act, governments now possess an unprecedented ability to monitor the activities of citizens.

Many civil rights and privacy groups, such as Reporters Without Borders, the Electronic Frontier Foundation, and the American Civil Liberties Union, have expressed concern that increasing surveillance of citizens will result in a mass surveillance society, with limited political and/or personal freedoms. Such fear has led to numerous lawsuits such as Hepting v. AT&T. The hacktivist group Anonymous has hacked into government websites in protest of what it considers "draconian surveillance".

== Network surveillance ==
The vast majority of computer surveillance involves the monitoring of personal data and traffic on the Internet. For example, in the United States, the Communications Assistance For Law Enforcement Act mandates that all phone calls and broadband internet traffic (emails, web traffic, instant messaging, etc.) be available for unimpeded, real-time monitoring by Federal law enforcement agencies.

Packet capture (also known as "packet sniffing") is the monitoring of data traffic on a network. Data sent between computers over the Internet or between any networks takes the form of small chunks called packets, which are routed to their destination and assembled back into a complete message. A packet capture appliance intercepts these packets, so that they may be examined and analyzed. Computer technology is needed to perform traffic analysis and sift through intercepted data to look for important/useful information. Under the Communications Assistance For Law Enforcement Act, all U.S. telecommunications providers are required to install such packet capture technology so that Federal law enforcement and intelligence agencies are able to intercept all of their customers' broadband Internet and voice over Internet protocol (VoIP) traffic. These technologies can be used both by the intelligence and for illegal activities.

There is far too much data gathered by these packet sniffers for human investigators to manually search through. Thus, automated Internet surveillance computers sift through the vast amount of intercepted Internet traffic, filtering out, and reporting to investigators those bits of information which are "interesting", for example, the use of certain words or phrases, visiting certain types of web sites, or communicating via email or chat with a certain individual or group. Billions of dollars per year are spent by agencies such as the Information Awareness Office, NSA, and the FBI, for the development, purchase, implementation, and operation of systems which intercept and analyze this data, extracting only the information that is useful to law enforcement and intelligence agencies.

Similar systems are now used by Iranian Security dept. to more easily distinguish between peaceful citizens and terrorists. All of the technology has been allegedly installed by German Siemens and Finnish Nokia.

The Internet's rapid development has become a primary form of communication. More people are potentially subject to Internet surveillance. There are advantages and disadvantages to network monitoring. For instance, systems described as "Web 2.0" have greatly impacted modern society. Tim O' Reilly, who first explained the concept of "Web 2.0", stated that Web 2.0 provides communication platforms that are "user generated", with self-produced content, motivating more people to communicate with friends online. However, Internet surveillance also has a disadvantage. One researcher from Uppsala University said "Web 2.0 surveillance is directed at large user groups who help to hegemonically produce and reproduce surveillance by providing user-generated (self-produced) content. We can characterize Web 2.0 surveillance as mass self-surveillance". Surveillance companies monitor people while they are focused on work or entertainment. Yet, employers themselves also monitor their employees. They do so in order to protect the company's assets and to control public communications but most importantly, to make sure that their employees are actively working and being productive. This can emotionally affect people; this is because it can cause emotions like jealousy. A research group states "...we set out to test the prediction that feelings of jealousy lead to 'creeping' on a partner through Facebook, and that women are particularly likely to engage in partner monitoring in response to jealousy". The study shows that women can become jealous of other people when they are in an online group.

Virtual assistants have become socially integrated into many people's lives. Currently, virtual assistants such as Amazon's Alexa or Apple's Siri cannot call 911 or local services. They are constantly listening for command and recording parts of conversations that will help improve algorithms. If the law enforcement is able to be called using a virtual assistant, the law enforcement would then be able to have access to all the information saved for the device. The device is connected to the home's internet, because of this law enforcement would be the exact location of the individual calling for law enforcement. While the virtual assistance devices are popular, many debates the lack of privacy. The devices are listening to every conversation the owner is having. Even if the owner is not talking to a virtual assistant, the device is still listening to the conversation in hopes that the owner will need assistance, as well as to gather data.

== Corporate surveillance ==
Corporate surveillance of computer activity is very common. The data collected is most often used for marketing purposes or sold to other corporations, but is also regularly shared with government agencies. It can be used as a form of business intelligence, which enables the corporation to better tailor their products and/or services to be desirable by their customers. The data can also be sold to other corporations so that they can use it for the aforementioned purpose, or it can be used for direct marketing purposes, such as targeted advertisements, where ads are targeted to the user of the search engine by analyzing their search history and emails (if they use free webmail services), which are kept in a database.

Such type of surveillance is also used to establish business purposes of monitoring, which may include the following:

- Preventing misuse of resources. Companies can discourage unproductive personal activities such as online shopping or web surfing on company time. Monitoring employee performance is one way to reduce unnecessary network traffic and reduce the consumption of network bandwidth.
- Promoting adherence to policies. Online surveillance is one means of verifying employee observance of company networking policies.
- Preventing lawsuits. Firms can be held liable for discrimination or employee harassment in the workplace. Organizations can also be involved in infringement suits through employees that distribute copyrighted material over corporate networks.
- Safeguarding records. Federal legislation requires organizations to protect personal information. Monitoring can determine the extent of compliance with company policies and programs overseeing information security. Monitoring may also deter unlawful appropriation of personal information, and potential spam or viruses.
- Safeguarding company assets. The protection of intellectual property, trade secrets, and business strategies is a major concern. The ease of information transmission and storage makes it imperative to monitor employee actions as part of a broader policy.

The second component of prevention is determining the ownership of technology resources. The ownership of the firm's networks, servers, computers, files, and e-mail should be explicitly stated. There should be a distinction between an employee's personal electronic devices, which should be limited and proscribed, and those owned by the firm.

For instance, Google Search stores identifying information for each web search. An IP address and the search phrase used are stored in a database for up to 18 months. Google also scans the content of emails of users of its Gmail webmail service in order to create targeted advertising based on what people are talking about in their personal email correspondences. Google is, by far, the largest Internet advertising agency—millions of sites place Google's advertising banners and links on their websites in order to earn money from visitors who click on the ads. Each page containing Google advertisements adds, reads, and modifies "cookies" on each visitor's computer. These cookies track the user across all of these sites and gather information about their web surfing habits, keeping track of which sites they visit, and what they do when they are on these sites. This information, along with the information from their email accounts, and search engine histories, is stored by Google to use to build a profile of the user to deliver better-targeted advertising.

The United States government often gains access to these databases, either by producing a warrant for it, or by simply asking. The Department of Homeland Security has openly stated that it uses data collected from consumer credit and direct marketing agencies for augmenting the profiles of individuals that it is monitoring.

== Web tracking ==
Web tracking is the practice by which operators of websites and third parties collect, store and share information about visitors' activities on the World Wide Web. Analysis of a user's behaviour may be used to provide content that enables the operator to infer their preferences and may be of interest to various parties, such as advertisers. Web tracking can be part of visitor management.

== Malicious software ==
In addition to monitoring information sent over a computer network, there is also a way to examine data stored on a computer's hard drive, and to monitor the activities of a person using the computer. A surveillance program installed on a computer can search the contents of the hard drive for suspicious data, can monitor computer use, collect passwords, and/or report back activities in real-time to its operator through the Internet connection. A keylogger is an example of this type of program. Normal keylogging programs store their data on the local hard drive, but some are programmed to automatically transmit data over the network to a remote computer or Web server.

There are multiple ways of installing such software. The most common is remote installation, using a backdoor created by a computer virus or trojan. This tactic has the advantage of potentially subjecting multiple computers to surveillance. Viruses often spread to thousands or millions of computers, and leave "backdoors" which are accessible over a network connection, and enable an intruder to remotely install software and execute commands. These viruses and trojans are sometimes developed by government agencies, such as CIPAV and Magic Lantern. More often, however, viruses created by other people or spyware installed by marketing agencies can be used to gain access through the security breaches that they create.

Another method is "cracking" into the computer to gain access over a network. An attacker can then install surveillance software remotely. Servers and computers with permanent broadband connections are most vulnerable to this type of attack. Another source of security cracking is employees giving out information or users using brute force tactics to guess their password.

One can also physically place surveillance software on a computer by gaining entry to the place where the computer is stored and install it from a compact disc, floppy disk, or thumbdrive. This method shares a disadvantage with hardware devices in that it requires physical access to the computer. One well-known worm that uses this method of spreading itself is Stuxnet.

== Social network analysis ==
One common form of surveillance is to create maps of social networks based on data from social networking sites as well as from traffic analysis information from phone call records such as those in the NSA call database, and internet traffic data gathered under CALEA. These social network "maps" are then data mined to extract useful information such as personal interests, friendships and affiliations, wants, beliefs, thoughts, and activities.

Many U.S. government agencies such as the Defense Advanced Research Projects Agency (DARPA), the National Security Agency (NSA), and the Department of Homeland Security (DHS) are currently investing heavily in research involving social network analysis. The intelligence community believes that the biggest threat to the U.S. comes from decentralized, leaderless, geographically dispersed groups. These types of threats are most easily countered by finding important nodes in the network, and removing them. To do this requires a detailed map of the network.

Jason Ethier of Northeastern University, in his study of modern social network analysis, said the following of the Scalable Social Network Analysis Program developed by the Information Awareness Office:

The purpose of the SSNA algorithms program is to extend techniques of social network analysis to assist with distinguishing potential terrorist cells from legitimate groups of people ... In order to be successful SSNA will require information on the social interactions of the majority of people around the globe. Since the Defense Department cannot easily distinguish between peaceful citizens and terrorists, it will be necessary for them to gather data on innocent civilians as well as on potential terrorists.

— Jason Ethier

== Monitoring from a distance ==
With only commercially available equipment, it has been shown that it is possible to monitor computers from a distance by detecting the radiation emitted by the CRT monitor. This form of computer surveillance, known as TEMPEST, involves reading electromagnetic emanations from computing devices in order to extract data from them at distances of hundreds of meters.

IBM researchers have also found that, for most computer keyboards, each key emits a slightly different noise when pressed. The differences are individually identifiable under some conditions, and so it's possible to log key strokes without actually requiring logging software to run on the associated computer.

In 2015, lawmakers in California passed a law prohibiting any investigative personnel in the state to force businesses to hand over digital communication without a warrant, calling this Electronic Communications Privacy Act. At the same time in California, state senator Jerry Hill introduced a bill making law enforcement agencies to disclose more information on their usage and information from the Stingray phone tracker device. As the law took into effect in January 2016, it will now require cities to operate with new guidelines in relation to how and when law enforcement use this device. Some legislators and those holding a public office have disagreed with this technology because of the warrantless tracking, but now if a city wants to use this device, it must be heard by a public hearing. Some cities have pulled out of using the StingRay such as Santa Clara County.

And it has also been shown, by Adi Shamir et al., that even the high frequency noise emitted by a CPU includes information about the instructions being executed.

== Policeware and govware ==
In German-speaking countries, spyware used or made by the government is sometimes called govware. Some countries like Switzerland and Germany have a legal framework governing the use of such software. Known examples include the Swiss MiniPanzer and MegaPanzer and the German R2D2 (trojan).

Policeware is a software designed to police citizens by monitoring the discussion and interaction of its citizens. Within the U.S., Carnivore was the first incarnation of secretly installed e-mail monitoring software installed in Internet service providers' networks to log computer communication, including transmitted e-mails. Magic Lantern is another such application, this time running in a targeted computer in a trojan style and performing keystroke logging. CIPAV, deployed by the FBI, is a multi-purpose spyware/trojan.

The Clipper Chip, formerly known as MYK-78, is a small hardware chip that the government can install into phones, designed in the nineties. It was intended to secure private communication and data by reading voice messages that are encoded and decode them. The Clipper Chip was designed during the Clinton administration to, "...protect personal safety and national security against a developing information anarchy that fosters criminals, terrorists and foreign foes." The government portrayed it as the solution to the secret codes or cryptographic keys that the age of technology created. Thus, this has raised controversy in the public, because the Clipper Chip is thought to have been the next "Big Brother" tool. This led to the failure of the Clipper proposal, even though there have been many attempts to push the agenda.

The "Consumer Broadband and Digital Television Promotion Act" (CBDTPA) was a bill proposed in the United States Congress. CBDTPA was known as the "Security Systems and Standards Certification Act" (SSSCA) while in draft form and was killed in committee in 2002. Had CBDTPA become law, it would have prohibited technology that could be used to read digital content under copyright (such as music, video, and e-books) without digital rights management (DRM) that prevented access to this material without the permission of the copyright holder.

== Surveillance as an aid to censorship ==
Surveillance and censorship are different. Surveillance can be performed without censorship, but it is harder to engage in censorship without some forms of surveillance. And even when surveillance does not lead directly to censorship, the widespread knowledge or belief that a person, their computer, or their use of the Internet is under surveillance can lead to self-censorship.

In March 2013 Reporters Without Borders issued a Special report on Internet surveillance that examines the use of technology that monitors online activity and intercepts electronic communication in order to arrest journalists, citizen-journalists, and dissidents. The report includes a list of "State Enemies of the Internet", Bahrain, China, Iran, Syria, and Vietnam, countries whose governments are involved in active, intrusive surveillance of news providers, resulting in grave violations of freedom of information and human rights. Computer and network surveillance is on the increase in these countries. The report also includes a second list of "Corporate Enemies of the Internet", including Amesys (France), Blue Coat Systems (U.S.), Gamma (UK and Germany), Hacking Team (Italy), and Trovicor (Germany), companies that sell products that are liable to be used by governments to violate human rights and freedom of information. Neither list is exhaustive and they are likely to be expanded in the future.

Protection of sources is no longer just a matter of journalistic ethics. Journalists should equip themselves with a "digital survival kit" if they are exchanging sensitive information online, storing it on a computer hard-drive or mobile phone. Individuals associated with high-profile rights organizations, dissident groups, protest groups, or reform groups are urged to take extra precautions to protect their online identities.

== Countermeasures ==
Countermeasures against surveillance vary based on the type of eavesdropping targeted. Electromagnetic eavesdropping, such as TEMPEST and its derivatives, often requires hardware shielding, such as Faraday cages, to block unintended emissions. To prevent interception of data in transit, encryption is a key defense. When properly implemented with end-to-end encryption, or while using tools such as Tor, and provided the device remains uncompromised and free from direct monitoring via electromagnetic analysis, audio recording, or similar methodologies, the content of communication is generally considered secure.

For a number of years, numerous government initiatives have sought to weaken encryption or introduce backdoors for law enforcement access. Privacy advocates and the broader technology industry strongly oppose these measures, arguing that any backdoor would inevitably be discovered and exploited by malicious actors. Such vulnerabilities would endanger everyone's private data while failing to hinder criminals, who could switch to alternative platforms or create their own encrypted systems.

Surveillance remains effective even when encryption is correctly employed, by exploiting metadata that is often accessible to packet sniffers unless countermeasures are applied. This includes DNS queries, IP addresses, phone numbers, URLs, timestamps, and communication durations, which can reveal significant information about user activity and interactions or associations with a person of interest.

Commercial VPNs are usually mentioned among countermeasures. However, while most of the traffic in a VPN is hidden from ISPs and other intermediaries, it is visible to the VPN provider.

== See also ==
- Anonymizer, a software system that attempts to make network activity untraceable
- Computer surveillance in the workplace
- Cyber spying
- Datacasting, a means of broadcasting files and Web pages using radio waves, allowing receivers near total immunity from traditional network surveillance techniques.
- Differential privacy, a method to maximize the accuracy of queries from statistical databases while minimizing the chances of violating the privacy of individuals.
- ECHELON, a signals intelligence (SIGINT) collection and analysis network operated on behalf of Australia, Canada, New Zealand, the United Kingdom, and the United States, also known as AUSCANNZUKUS and Five Eyes
- GhostNet, a large-scale cyber spying operation discovered in March 2009
- List of government surveillance projects
- Internet censorship and surveillance by country
- Mass surveillance
  - China's Golden Shield Project
  - Mass surveillance in Australia
  - Mass surveillance in China
  - Mass surveillance in East Germany
  - Mass surveillance in India
  - Mass surveillance in North Korea
  - Mass surveillance in the United Kingdom
  - Mass surveillance in the United States
- Surveillance

- Surveillance by the United States government:
  - 2013 mass surveillance disclosures, reports about NSA and its international partners' mass surveillance of foreign nationals and U.S. citizens
  - Bullrun (code name), a highly classified NSA program to preserve its ability to eavesdrop on encrypted communications by influencing and weakening encryption standards, by obtaining master encryption keys, and by gaining access to data before or after it is encrypted either by agreement, by force of law, or by computer network exploitation (hacking)
  - Carnivore, a U.S. Federal Bureau of Investigation system to monitor email and electronic communications
  - COINTELPRO, a series of covert, and at times illegal, projects conducted by the FBI aimed at U.S. domestic political organizations
  - Communications Assistance For Law Enforcement Act
  - Computer and Internet Protocol Address Verifier (CIPAV), a data gathering tool used by the U.S. Federal Bureau of Investigation (FBI)
  - Dropmire, a secret surveillance program by the NSA aimed at surveillance of foreign embassies and diplomatic staff, including those of NATO allies
  - Magic Lantern, keystroke logging software developed by the U.S. Federal Bureau of Investigation
  - Mass surveillance in the United States
  - NSA call database, a database containing metadata for hundreds of billions of telephone calls made in the U.S.
  - NSA warrantless surveillance (2001–07)
  - NSA whistleblowers: William Binney, Thomas Andrews Drake, Mark Klein, Edward Snowden, Thomas Tamm, Russ Tice
  - Spying on United Nations leaders by United States diplomats
  - Stellar Wind (code name), code name for information collected under the President's Surveillance Program
  - Tailored Access Operations, NSA's hacking program
  - Terrorist Surveillance Program, an NSA electronic surveillance program
  - Total Information Awareness, a project of the Defense Advanced Research Projects Agency (DARPA)
- TEMPEST, codename for studies of unintentional intelligence-bearing signals which, if intercepted and analyzed, may disclose the information transmitted, received, handled, or otherwise processed by any information-processing equipment
