= Mass surveillance in East Germany =

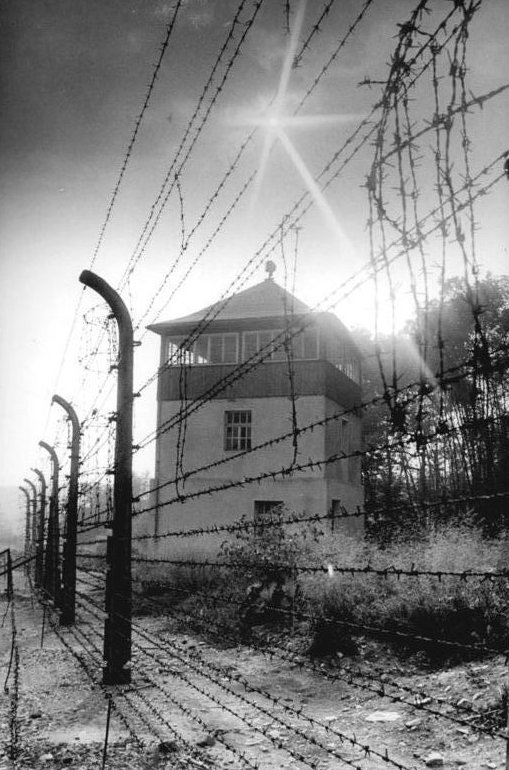
The NKVD special camps in Germany 1945–50 included the former Buchenwald (1983 photo)

Mass surveillance in East Germany was a widespread practice throughout the country's history, involving Soviet, East German, and Western agencies.

== Background ==
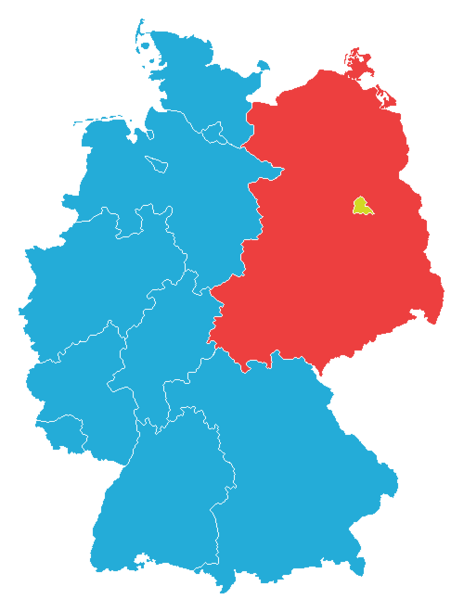
Map showing the division of East and West Germany until 1990, with West Berlin in yellow.

East Germany, known formally as the "German Democratic Republic" or the "Deutsche Demokratische Republik", was an Eastern Bloc state from 1949 to 1990. Its territory consisted of the region of Germany that had been controlled by Soviet forces at the end of World War II.

Penalties for unapproved political contacts were most severe. Though initially those sent to the NKVD camps were largely interned members of the Nazi Party or the juvenile Werwolf, sentenced inmates came to include many supporters of the Social Democratic Party of Germany (SPD), which became the focus of Soviet authorities in 1946. When the Social Democratic Party was merged into the Communist Party of Germany (KPD), renamed Socialist Unity Party of Germany (SED), Social Democrats were interned to ensure Stalinist dominance in the party. Also, people were interned as "spies" for suspected opposition to the authoritarian regime, e.g. for contacts to organizations based in the Western occupation zones, on the basis of Article 58 of the Soviet penal code dealing with "anti-Soviet activities".

Of 123,000 Germans and 35,000 others held in the NKVD special camps, 43,000 died. Of the 10,000 youths and children interned, half did not return.

== Soviet surveillance ==
In 1947, the Soviet Military Administration in Germany (SMAD) issued Order No. 201, which established a fifth organization of Eastern German police, called Kommissariat 5 (K-5). The mission of K-5 was primarily to conduct surveillance of individuals in East Germany, especially those in East German governing bodies. While nominally controlled by the young East German government, in practice, K-5 operated as a sub-unit of the Soviet KGB. Most of K-5's cases came from the KGB, and KGB officers were present through the organization. KGB officers were involved in day-to-day K-5 operations like training and interrogations.

== Domestic surveillance ==
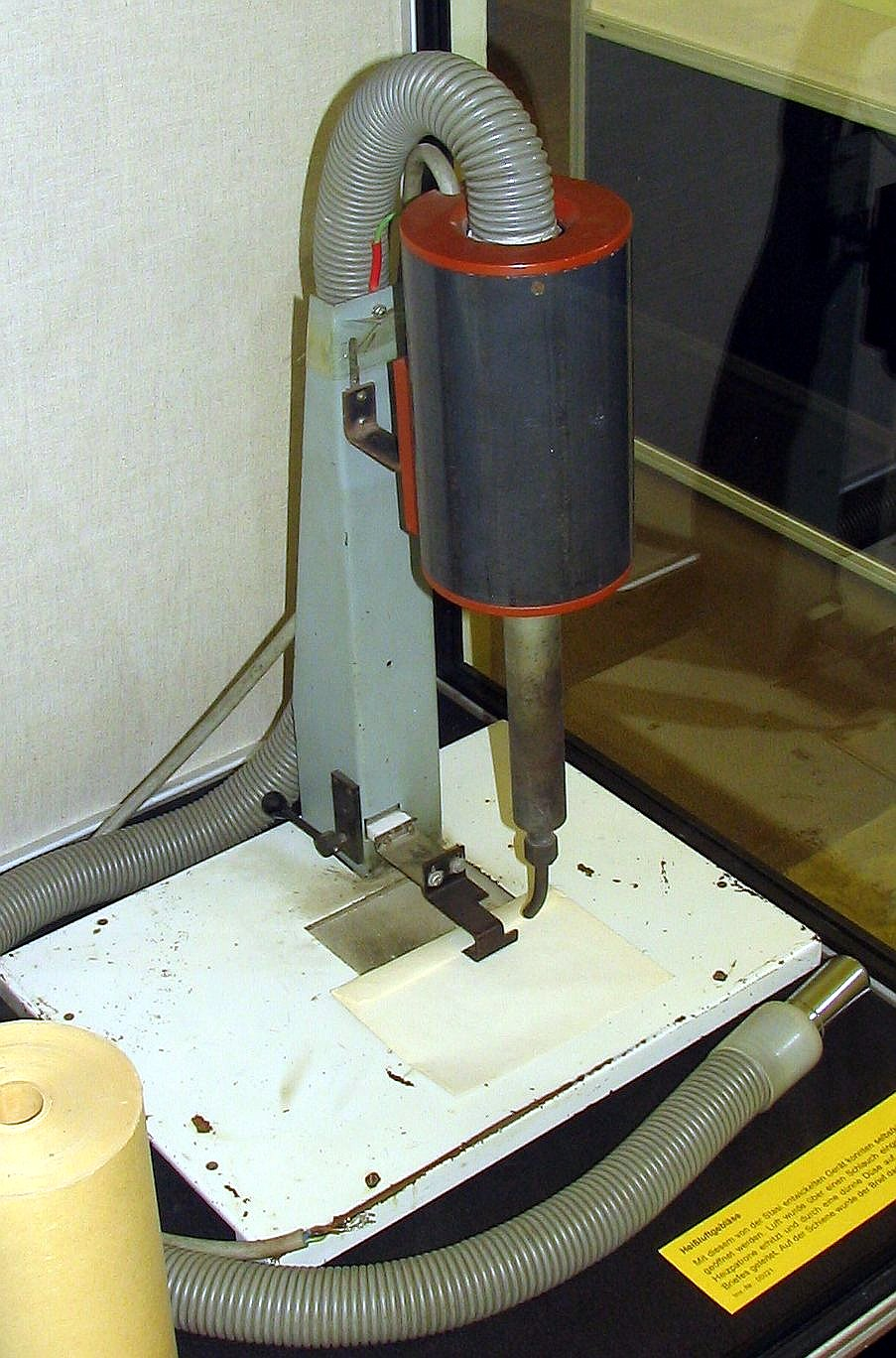
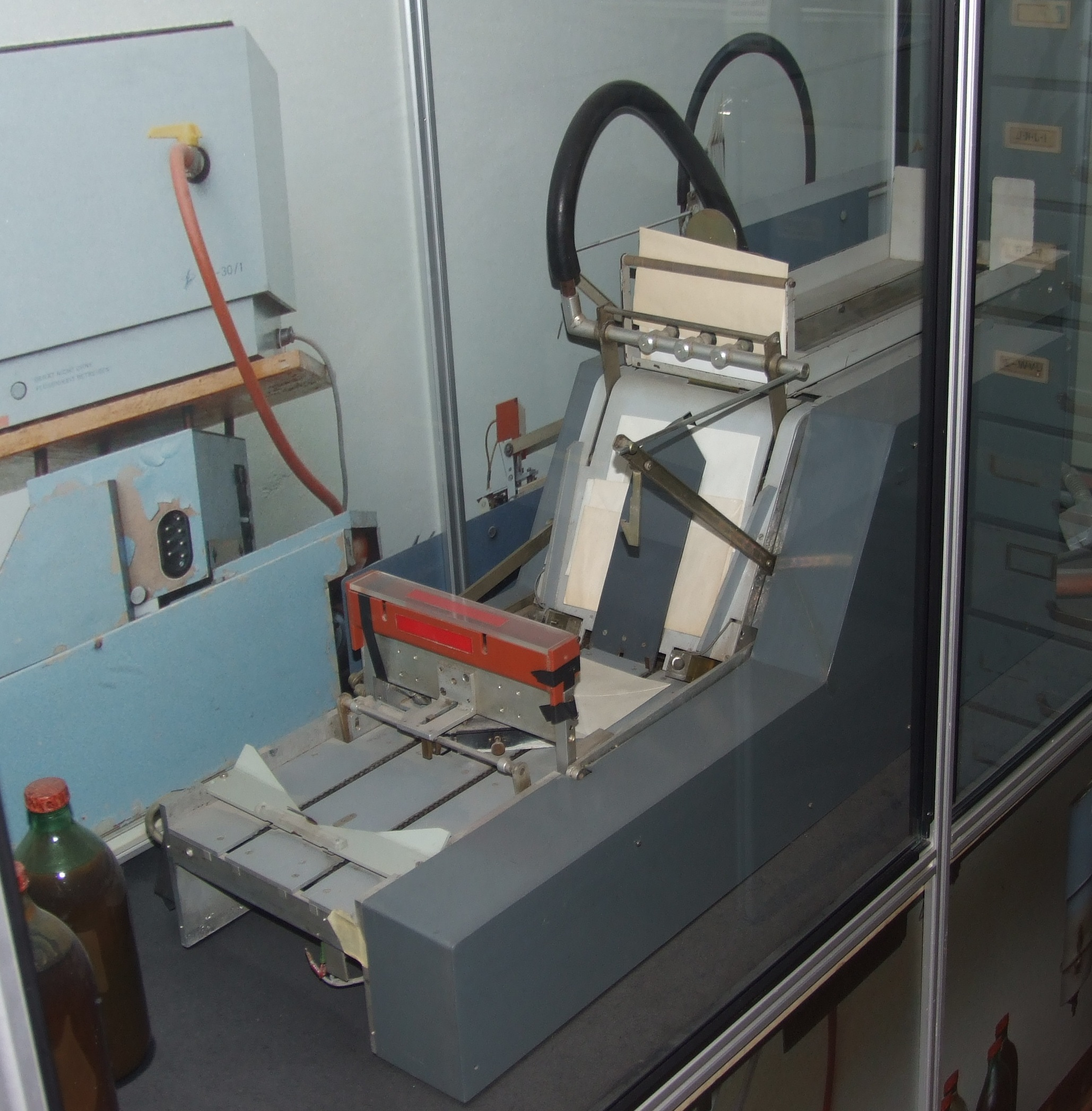
In Department M, mail was opened with a hot air blower (left), inspected, then resealed in assembly line fashion by a machine (right).

On 8 February 1950, East Germany saw the establishment of the Ministry for State Security (Ministerium für Staatssicherheit), commonly known as the Stasi. The Stasi sought to "know everything about everyone". Its annual budget has been estimated at approximately $1 billion. The Stasi kept files on about 5.6 million people.

The Stasi had 90,000 full-time employees who were assisted by 170,000 full-time unofficial collaborators (Inoffizielle Mitarbeiter); together these made up 1 in 63 (nearly 2%) of the entire East German population. Together with these, a much larger number of occasional informers brought up the total to 1 per 6.5 persons.

People in East Germany were subjected to a variety of techniques, including audio and video surveillance of their homes, reading mail, extortion, and bribery.

== International surveillance ==
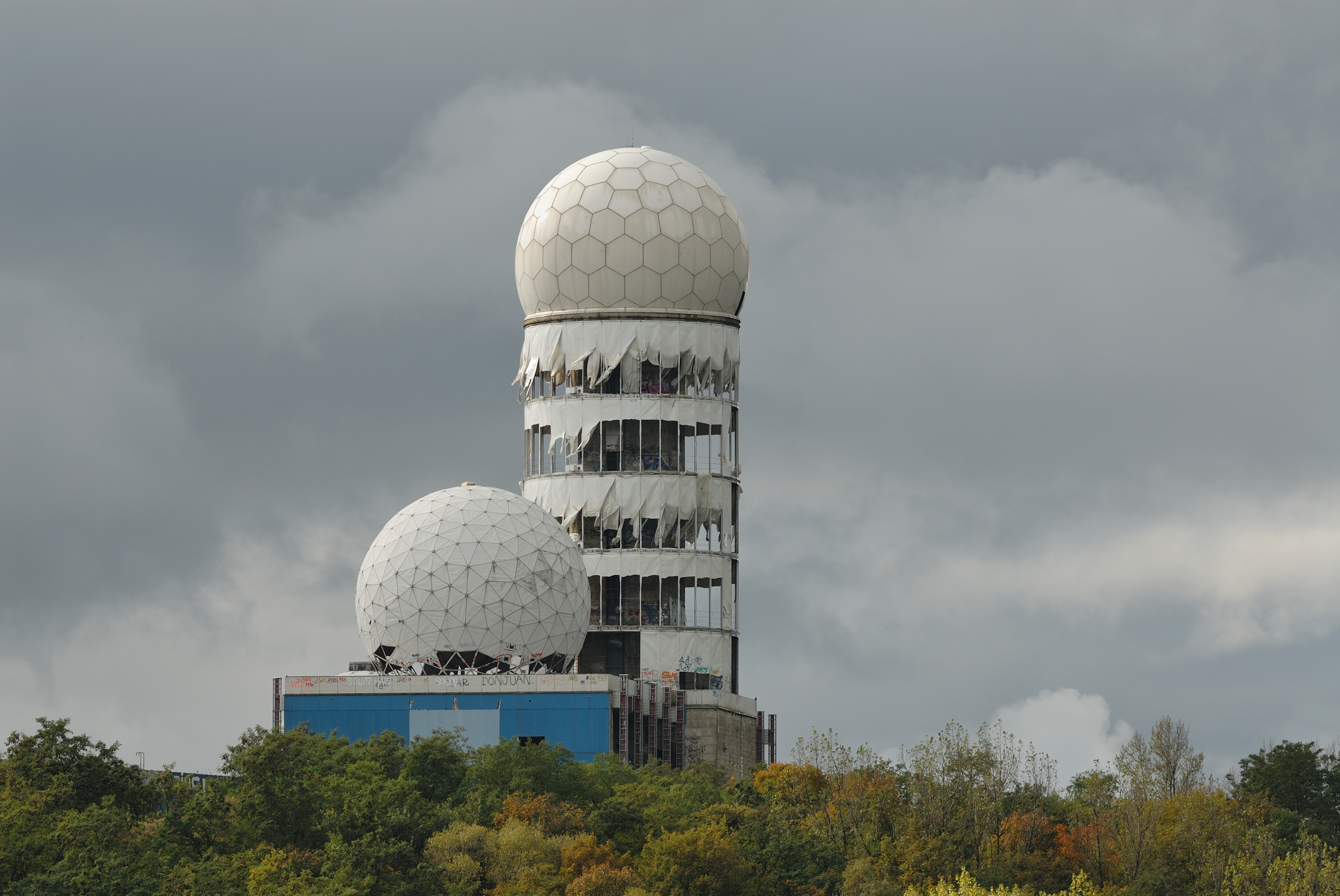
Some of the radomes of the former NSA listening station on top of the Teufelsberg

The West German intelligence agency Bundesnachrichtendienst (BND) employed approximately 10,000 East Germans as spies.

The US National Security Agency (NSA) built one of its largest listening stations on top of Teufelsberg hill in the British sector of West Berlin, allegedly part of the global surveillance network ECHELON. "The Hill", as it was known colloquially, began operation in July 1961. A large structure was built atop the hill, which would come to be run by the NSA (National Security Agency). Construction of a permanent facility was begun in October 1963. The station continued to operate until the fall of East Germany and the Berlin Wall, after which the station was closed and its equipment removed. However, the huge buildings and massive radar domes still remain in place.

== Reunification and aftermath ==
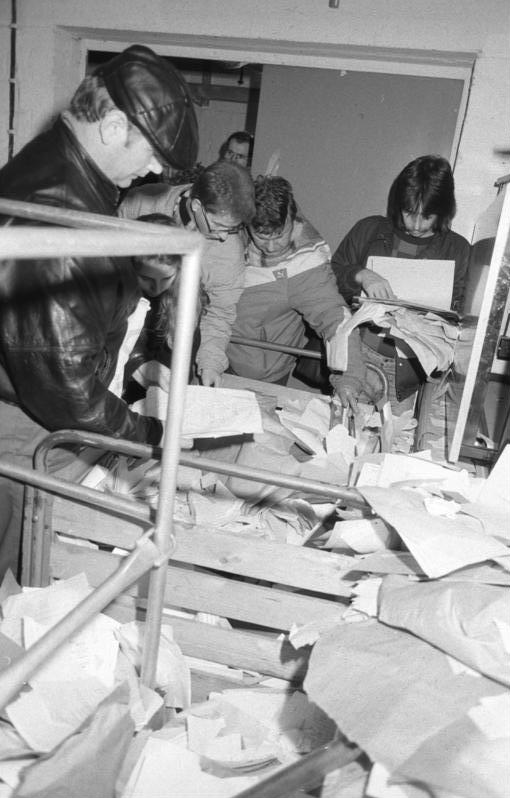
In January 1990, demonstrators broke into the Stasi headquarters.

On 3 October 1990, the states of East Germany formally joined the Federal Republic of Germany to reunite East and West Germany.

As a result of the revolution, Stasi files fell into the hands of the reunited German government. The Federal Commissioner for the Stasi Records was formed to control those files.

== See also ==
- Mass surveillance in Australia
- Mass surveillance in Russia
- Mass surveillance in the United States
- Mass surveillance in the United Kingdom
