= Individual capacity =

Legal term

In law, individual capacity is a term of art referring to one's status as a natural person, distinct from any other role.

For example, an officer, employee or agent of a corporation, acting "in their individual capacity" is acting as an individual, rather than as an agent of the corporation. Thus, their actions, in their capacity as an individual would not generally incur a liability on the part of the corporation (this concept is also known as a corporate liability), nor would they have any protection from liability for their own actions as an individual.

In general, a person may be said by a second party to be acting in their capacity as an individual, whenever the person's actions are the result of their own decisions, rather than being actions to which they are obligated in their capacity as an agent of another person or agency.
