= Magic Lantern (spyware) =

Keystroke logging software reportedly developed by the US FBI

- Original author: Federal Bureau of Investigation
- Operating system: Microsoft Windows
- Type: Keylogger

Magic Lantern is a keystroke logging software created by the United States' Federal Bureau of Investigation (FBI). Magic Lantern was first reported in a column by Bob Sullivan of MSNBC on November 20, 2001 and by Ted Bridis of the Associated Press.

== Methodology ==
Magic Lantern can reportedly be installed remotely, via an e-mail attachment or by exploiting common operating system vulnerabilities, unlike previous keystroke logger programs used by the FBI. It has been described as a virus and a Trojan horse. It is not known how the program might store or communicate the recorded keystrokes.

== Purpose ==
In response to a Freedom of Information Act request filed in 2000 by the Electronic Privacy Information Center, the FBI released a series of unclassified documents relating to Carnivore, which included the "Enhanced Carnivore Project Plan". Sullivan's confidential source said that redacted portions of that document mention "Cyber Knight",

a database that sorts and matches data gathered using various Carnivore-like methods from e-mail, chat rooms, instant messages, and Internet phone calls. It also matches files with captured encryption keys.

== Example deployment method ==
The FBI intends to deploy Magic Lantern in the form of an e-mail attachment. When the attachment is opened, it installs a trojan horse on the suspect's computer. The trojan horse is activated when the suspect uses PGP encryption, often used to increase the security of sent e-mail messages. When activated, the trojan horse will log the PGP password, which allows the FBI to decrypt user communications.

Spokesmen for the FBI soon confirmed the existence of a program called Magic Lantern. They denied that it had been deployed, and they declined to comment further.

== Antivirus vendor cooperation ==
The disclosure of the existence of Magic Lantern sparked a debate as to whether anti-virus companies could or should detect the FBI's keystroke logger.

Concerns include uncertainties about Magic Lantern's full potential and whether hackers could subvert it for purposes outside the jurisdiction of the law.

Bridis reported that Network Associates (maker of McAfee anti-virus products), had contacted the FBI following the press reports about Magic Lantern to ensure their anti-virus software would not detect the program. Network Associates issued a denial, fueling speculation as to which anti-virus products might or might not detect government trojans.

CNET News has surveyed 13 security companies about their contacts with and level of cooperation with law enforcement authorities. None of them confirmed that their products cover up malware installed by the government.

Graham Cluley, a technology consultant from Sophos, said "We have no way of knowing if it was written by the FBI, and even if we did, we wouldn't know whether it was being used by the FBI or if it had been commandeered by a third party". Another reaction from this came from Marc Maiffret, chief technology officer and cofounder of eEye Digital Security who states: "Our customers are paying us for a service, to protect them from all forms of malicious code. It is not up to us to do law enforcement's job for them so we do not, and will not, make any exceptions for law enforcement malware or other tools."

When asked if Magic Lantern would need a court order to deploy, FBI spokesman Paul Bresson would not comment, stating: "Like all technology projects or tools deployed by the FBI it would be used pursuant to the appropriate legal process." Proponents of Magic Lantern argue the technology would allow law enforcement to efficiently and quickly decrypt messages protected by encryption schemes. Implementing Magic Lantern does not require physical access to a suspect's computer, unlike Carnivore, a predecessor to Magic Lantern, since physical access to a computer would require a court order.

Following the media coverage of Magic Lantern, F-Secure (a Finnish anti-virus company), announced their new policy on detecting government spying programs.

== See also ==
- Backdoor (computing)
- Carnivore (software)
- Computer and Internet Protocol Address Verifier, a more recent FBI tool
- ECHELON
- FOXACID
- Main Core
- MiniPanzer and MegaPanzer
- Policeware
- PRISM (surveillance program)
- R2D2 (trojan)
