= Dropmire =

Dropmire is a surveillance program by the United States' National Security Agency (NSA) aimed at surveillance of foreign embassies and diplomatic staff, including those of NATO allies. The program's existence was revealed in June 2013 by whistleblower Edward Snowden in The Guardian. The report alleged that at least 38 foreign embassies were under surveillance, some of them as far back as 2007.

Earlier in June 2013, The Guardian had reported that the NSA spied on diplomats during the 2009 G-20 London Summit, but no precise program name was revealed at the time.

Diplomatic spying by the United States had been revealed as far back as 2010, when it was revealed that US agencies had spied on the secretary-general of the United Nations, Ban Ki-moon – at the time, it was not known that this had been done as part of a systematic program.

== See also ==
- Crypto AG
- Global surveillance disclosures (2013–present)
- Spying on United Nations leaders by United States diplomats
- Room 641A
- Tempora
