= Kitboga (streamer) =

American YouTuber, Twitch streamer, and scambaiter

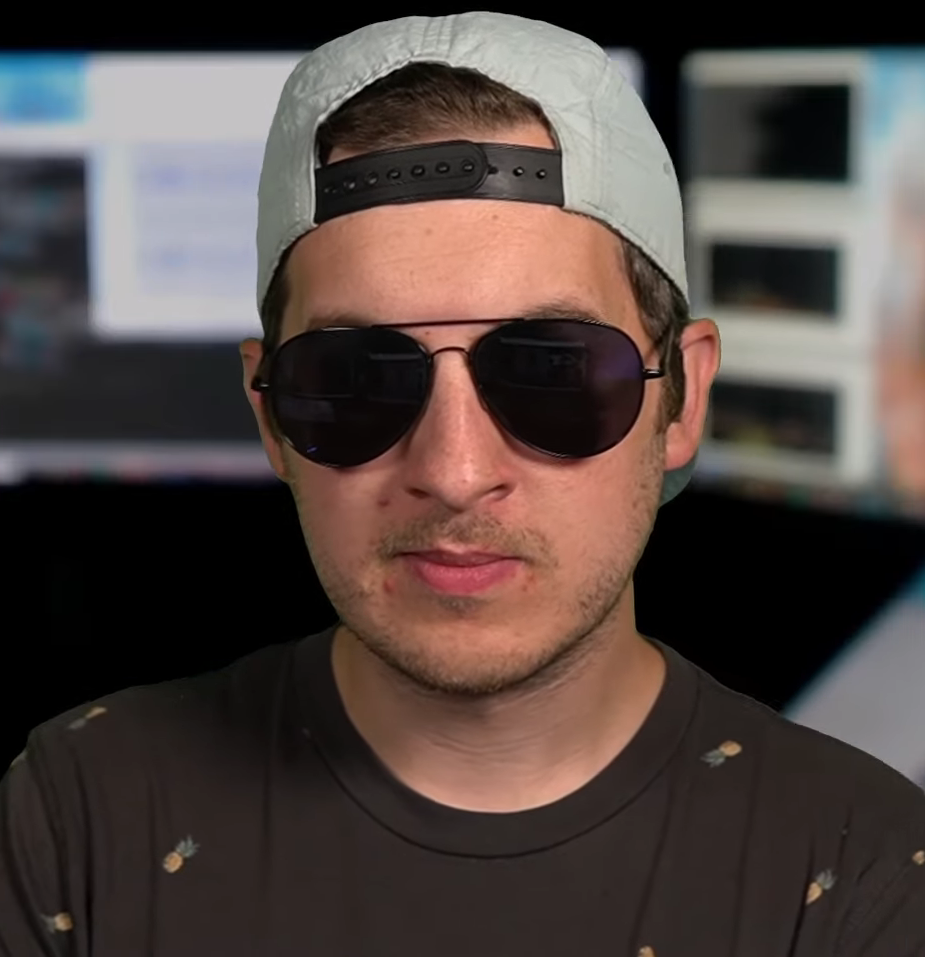
- Kitboga in 2024

Twitch information
- Channel: Kitboga
- Years active: 2017–present
- Genre: Scambaiting
- Followers: 1.3 million

YouTube information
- Channel: Kitboga
- Years active: 2017-present
- Subscribers: 4 million
- Views: 845 million
- Last updated: September 23, 2026
- Website: kitboga.com

Kitboga is the Internet alias of an American Twitch streamer and YouTuber whose content primarily focuses on scam baiting against phone fraud. His channel has over one million followers on Twitch, and his YouTube channel has over three million subscribers.

== Career ==
=== Scambaiting ===
In mid-2017, Kitboga found out that his grandmother had fallen victim to many scams designed to prey on the elderly, both online and in person. He then discovered "Lenny", a loop of vague pre-recorded messages that scam baiters play during calls to convince the scammer that there is a real person on the phone without providing any useful information to the scammer. After seeing these videos uploaded to YouTube, he decided to replicate the calls himself. While he started out streaming for his friends on Twitch, his viewership soon started growing beyond his immediate circles.

In March 2020, with the growing prevalence of the COVID-19 pandemic, Kitboga started baiting scammers who were selling an essential oil which they dishonestly claimed was a cure for COVID-19, following a United States Federal Trade Commission warning alerting consumers of coronavirus-related scams.

In November 2020, Kitboga was signed by talent agency UTA. In May 2022, Kitboga was signed by Ryan Morrison's Evolved Talent Agency, again to expand Kitboga's goal of anti-scam messaging.

In May 2023, Kitboga partnered with Kraken, a cryptocurrency exchange, to create a spoof Kraken account to trap scammers into giving wallet addresses from stolen crypto accounts, along with their personally identifiable information should they decide to sign up for an account.

==== Technique ====
In his videos, Kitboga engages in scam baiting with several types of scammers. Besides technical support scammers, he also engages with refund scammers, IRS scammers, social security scammers, and others. He mixes elements of popular culture into his dialogue and wordplay into some calls; for example, in one March 2020 call against a scammer falsely claiming to sell a COVID-19 cure, Kitboga implied the scammer should be called "Saint Anne", eliding the two words to sound like "Satan".

To misdirect scammers away from his real identity, as well as for viewer entertainment, Kitboga often poses as many different characters during his videos, including an elderly woman or man, a Russian man named Vicktor Viktoor, a valley girl named Nevaeh ("Heaven" spelled backward), or a competing technical support scammer named Daniel. He does this by imitating the accent or vocal intonation of the character he is trying to portray, often with a voice changer to alter the pitch of his voice. The common factor uniting Kitboga's characters is that they are not computer-savvy, giving the scammer confidence that the scam is more likely to succeed.

The scams against which Kitboga engages in scambaiting often require the victim to install remote desktop software. As an example, in the case of technical support scams, the scammers request access to the victim's computer to "diagnose" a technical issue (where none exists), for which they then request payment to "fix". Because of the risks involved in remotely connecting to an unknown computer, Kitboga uses a different computer than his while scambaiting; the computer runs a virtual machine equipped with a virtual private network. This ensures not only that any malware or other software installed by the scammer does not affect his computer, but also hides his true IP address and location from the scammers. However, scammers can sometimes discern when a potential victim is using a virtual machine, so Kitboga and his team "have spent countless hours 'spoofing' [their] virtual machine to look and feel like a well-used, average computer."

Types of phone scams other than the technical support scam also often involve the scammer giving some reason to connect to the victim's computer. In online refund scams, for example, the scammer requests to connect to the victim's computer to access their online banking website. When Kitboga interacts with these scammers, in addition to taking the aforementioned precautions, he also uses a fake online banking website he created specifically for use in this type of scambaiting. This website contains features that waste time for scammers, and Easter eggs for the entertainment of Kitboga's audience.

When baiting IRS scammers and other types of scammers that request payments via gift card, Kitboga uses a piece of computer code to make the gift card redemption page appear to accept any gift code that follows a specified format. Then, when the scammer asks him to read out gift codes so that they can claim them, he types false codes into the page and redeems them himself, pretending not to know any better.

At the end of bait calls, Kitboga sometimes turns off his voice changer and reveals that he has been aware that the call was an attempted scam the entire time. Some of the scammers immediately hang up when Kitboga reveals the ruse to them. Others' reactions range from anger to regret, with some maintaining that they are legitimate tech support agents. Still others are unrepentantly dismissive, informing him that plenty of impending victims yet await on hold.

Many memes have spawned from Kitboga's videos, one of the most popular being the "Do not redeem" meme that began in August 2020 in which a cantankerous and abrasive scammer from India using the fake name "Steve Watson" spends nine hours attempting to trick Kitboga (in the role of an elderly woman named Paula) into sending him Google Play gift cards so he can resell them for profit, only for Kitboga to start pretending to redeem all the cards in front of him, while "Steve" frantically screams not to redeem the cards (the scam requires the victim to either send a picture of the code on the back of the gift card or read it out to him, and redeeming them prevents the scammer from receiving the money). The original "Do not redeem" video remains one of the most popular videos on his channel, with a view count of 23 million as of September 2025.

==== Usage of AI ====
In March 2025, Kitboga publicly launched an AI bot system he had been developing for five years, designed to proactively call scam operations at scale. The system uses generative AI chatbots that convert scammers' speech to text and run it through a natural language model to generate responses in real time. He partnered with a developer known as ABK to create AI voices trained on various personas, including his character "Granny Edna".

The bots actively dial scam operations identified through fake emails and advertisements, with multiple bots calling a scam center simultaneously to occupy all available operators. Kitboga stated that he can run six to twelve bots at a time because of hardware limits, and has created a separate YouTube channel called "AI Kitboga" to showcase the bot interactions. Intelligence gathered by the bots feeds into Seraph Secure, his anti-scam software application.

===== Bitcoin ATM maze =====
Kitboga developed a "Bitcoin ATM maze," a fake Bitcoin ATM receipt system designed to trap scammers in an endless series of tasks. The receipt contains a doctored QR code linking to a fake cryptocurrency exchange and a 1-800 hotline that leads scammers into an automated maze. The system features time-consuming challenges including CAPTCHAs that ask scammers to estimate how many nuts are in a bucket, and a fan-created challenge requiring users to play "Sandstorm" by Darude on a virtual keyboard.

Over more than a year, the system trapped approximately 500 scammers for a combined total of 3,953 hours (approximately 164 days), with the average scammer spending nearly three hours in the maze and the longest session lasting 156 hours (six and a half days). The maze collects actionable intelligence, including Bitcoin wallet addresses and, in some cases, access to scammers' cameras, which is shared with law enforcement and partner exchanges like Kraken to freeze illicit funds. Kitboga described it as his most effective tool for gathering intelligence, noting that his team of 12 now actively searches for scammers to target. The team is developing similar maze systems for gift card scams and cash-by-mail schemes.

=== Other work ===
Kitboga has actively promoted computer science education. He regularly holds computer programming streams where he maintains some of the tools he uses in his scambaiting calls. Kitboga partnered with the STEM organization FIRST in 2018 to stream the building of a real-life "meme-o-meter" as used in his scambaiting streams; during the stream, he interacted with children interested in STEM through the stream chat. He stated in 2021 that he was looking into building an AI scambaiting program.

In 2025, Kitboga organized a competition called Kitboga code jam, in which participants would need to create an intentionally absurd captcha, selected submission would be featured on stream and winners submission would be used live against scammers, in 2026, another competition called Kitboga creation jam would be held, participant would need to create an intentionally absurd advertisement or intentionally absurd skip ad button, selected submission would be showcased on stream and winners submission would be used live against scammers, the competitions would be sponsored by Kraken.

Before starting his Twitch and YouTube channels, Kitboga worked in software engineering, and used his technical background and knowledge of virtual machines to protect himself while scambaiting. He has said that if more people become aware of the scams he tries to bait, decreasing their prevalence, he will consider returning to software engineering or changing the focus of his stream to coding or playing video games.

In 2024, Kitboga launched a new software package called Seraph Secure, which blocks known malware and phishing websites and disables software commonly used by scammers to gain remote access to the computer on which it is installed.

== Awards and nominations ==
Year	Ceremony	Category	Result	Ref.
2021	The Streamer Awards	League of Their Own	Nominated	
2022	The Streamer Awards	League of Their Own	Nominated	
2025	GASA Scam Fighter of the Year	Best Scam Fighting Individual	Won	

== Personal life ==
Kitboga has spoken about his experiences with ADHD on live streams.

== See also ==
- Jim Browning (YouTuber) – Northern Irish YouTube personality and scam baiter
- Scammer Payback – American YouTuber and scambaiter
