= Scammer Payback =

American YouTuber and scambaiter

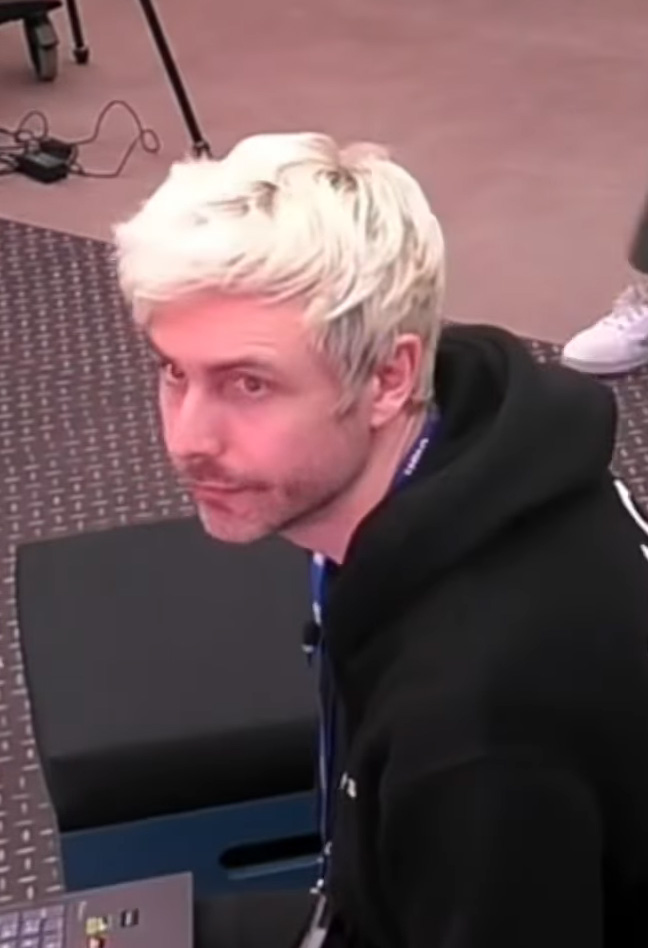
- Scammer Payback in 2025
- Other name: Pierogi
- Occupations: YouTuber; scambaiter

Twitch information
- Channel: ScammerPayback
- Followers: 223K

YouTube information
- Channel: Scammer Payback
- Subscribers: 9.5 million
- Views: 1.46 billion
- Last updated: 17 October 2026
- Website: www.scammerpayback.org

Scammer Payback, also known by his nickname "Pierogi", is an American YouTuber and streamer, who specializes in creating content about scam baiting against phone scams and Internet scams. He works against a variety of scams over the phone, such as technical support scams, refund scams, social security scams, and IRS impersonation scams. He also has a dedicated team working to find numbers which link to different scams, alongside trying to stop other people from being scammed by using reverse connections.

== Career ==
Pierogi previously worked as a cybersecurity professional. He launched his YouTube channel "Scammer Payback" on May 16, 2008, focusing on high-production scam-baiting content in which he pretends to be a scam victim by portraying a variety of characters with the use of a voice changer to waste the scammers' time and distract them. While distracted, Pierogi uses his expertise in cybersecurity to infiltrate the scammers' computer networks from his virtual machine, and proceeds to delete their files and gather their location and information to expose and use against them. Throughout his career, Pierogi has been able to stop numerous scams in progress and give money back to scam victims. He is known to read out the scammer's real name and location that he has discovered through the process, usually on livestream.

Pierogi has been in a number of collaborations with other content creators, having worked alongside Kai Cenat, Mark Rober, Trilogy Media, and Jim Browning. In 2022, Pierogi and his team set up an anti-scam call center dedicated to scam baiting. Named the "People's Call Center", its participants consisted of Pierogi and several other scambaiters who spent one week at the call center monitoring scam call centers, wasting the scammers' time, and preventing people from getting scammed. This has now become somewhat of a yearly tradition, with the "People's Call Center" making a return in 2023, 2024, and 2025.
