= COVID-19 scams =

Scams related to COVID-19

COVID-19 scams are scams whose cover story primarily relies on the existence of the COVID-19 pandemic. They have been reported in multiple countries, primarily the United States, Canada and the United Kingdom.

Within the United Kingdom there were many instances of companies contracted to provide COVID-19 testing kits and personal protective equipment (PPE), when the companies had direct ties to those in the UK parliament.

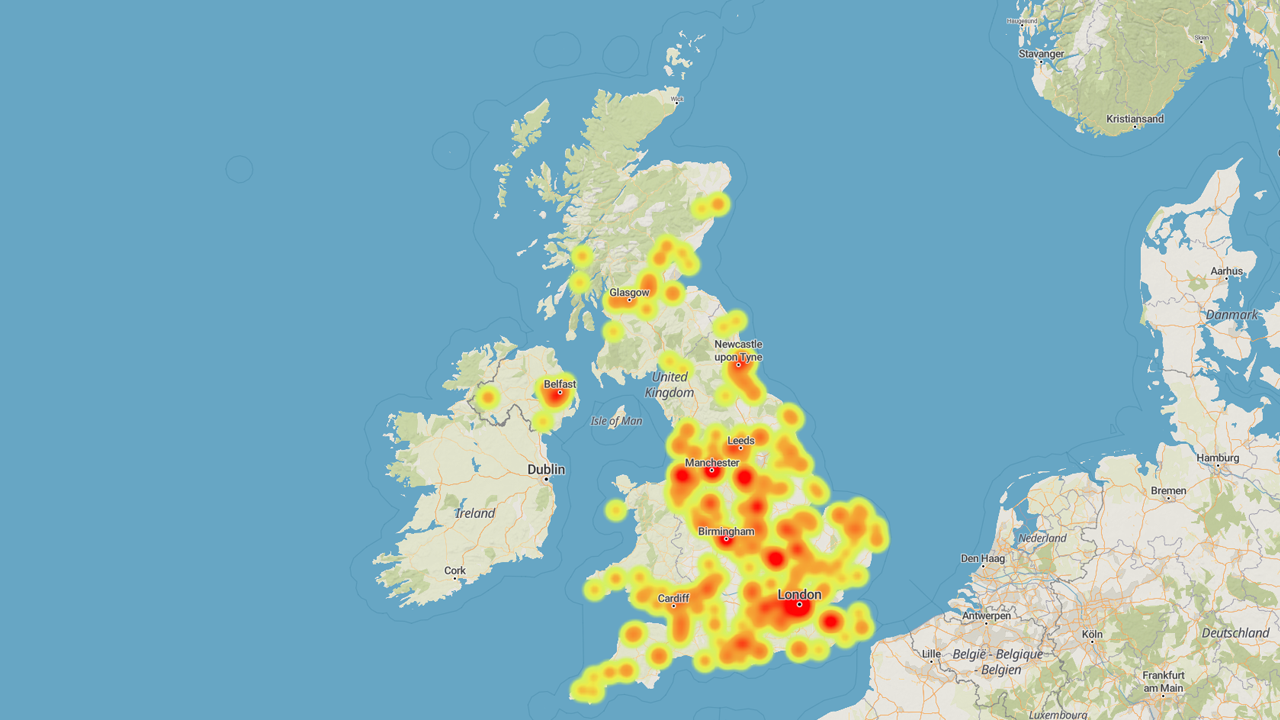
COVID-19 scam phone calls in UK; heatmap

== Initiation ==
COVID-19 scams are initiated in a variety of ways, such as by robocalls, emails, fake blog and social media posts and text messaging. Researchers found that fear of COVID-19 and anxiety increased the success of phishing scams.

== Types of scams ==
=== Benefit/grant scams ===
In this variation of COVID-19 scams, the fraudster claims that the victim is eligible for a COVID-19 benefit payment. This scam is a derivative of the advance-fee scam, where the scammer will ask the victim for a small payment in return for the 'benefit'. The scammer will then ask for further payments under the guise of problems, until the victim refuses to pay any further.

=== Authority impersonation scams ===
The United Nations WHO has issued a warning that fraudsters posing as employees of the WHO were attempting to gain personal information through phishing emails and fake help lines.

=== COVID-19 vaccination scams ===
In this variation, the fraudster will offer to sell the victim a 'COVID-19 vaccine' or treatment. Victims who fall for this scam reveal their personal information and payment information to the scammer. In one reported incident, victims in the UK were sent a text message purporting to be from the National Health Service which claimed that they were now eligible to receive a COVID-19 vaccine, but needed to fill their personal details into an online phishing form to book a place on the program. Information lost by the victims included their debit card information, which was then used to withdraw funds from the victim's bank account. COVID-19 vaccination scams have been reported in various countries including the United Kingdom, United States and Singapore.

=== COVID-19 testing scams ===
In this variation of COVID-19 scams, the fraudster claims they are authorized testing site that could offer COVID-19 test. But it require people to offer their health-related information. US department of Health and Human Services sent fraud alert to the public about fraud schemes.

== COVID-19 related stock scams ==
In the United States, victims were persuaded to buy stocks in companies which were claimed to be about to release a 'miracle cure' for COVID-19 through posts in Facebook. The Independent reported that online adverts claimed to sell "vaccine bonds" purportedly linked to the US drug company and COVID-19 vaccine manufacturer Pfizer, which were sold with a minimum of US$10,000 investment. Pfizer confirmed it had no links to these bonds.

As of mid-December 2020, the U.S. Securities and Exchange Commission has suspended trading in 36 companies which claimed to have access to COVID-19 related materials such as testing kits and treatments.

== United Kingdom Fraud ==
The first published incident was in May 2020, where a healthcare firm was contracted to produce COVID-19 testing kits, however there was no competitive process to the contract and the healthcare firm hired a Conservative MP Owen Paterson as a consultant. Subsequent contracts worth £1.7 billion to have been handed out without due process, prioritising those with connections within the government.

Further issues appeared as there were issues with some of the masks purchased, leading to the removal of fifty million masks, a £252 million contract, as they did not meet the health standards provided by the NHS. In December 2020, a company was found to have provided £122 million worth of gowns that weren't used due to the slow approval process, which was hampered due to investigations into the companies origins, as it had been formed 6 weeks prior to the contract.

== Losses ==
According to the Federal Trade Commission, from the start of the COVID-19 pandemic to April 30, 2020, US$13.44M was lost in total due to coronavirus fraud.

== See also ==
- COVID-19 misinformation
- IRS impersonation scam
- SSA impersonation scam
- Technical support scam
