= Rosie Okumura =

American voice actress, content creator, and musician

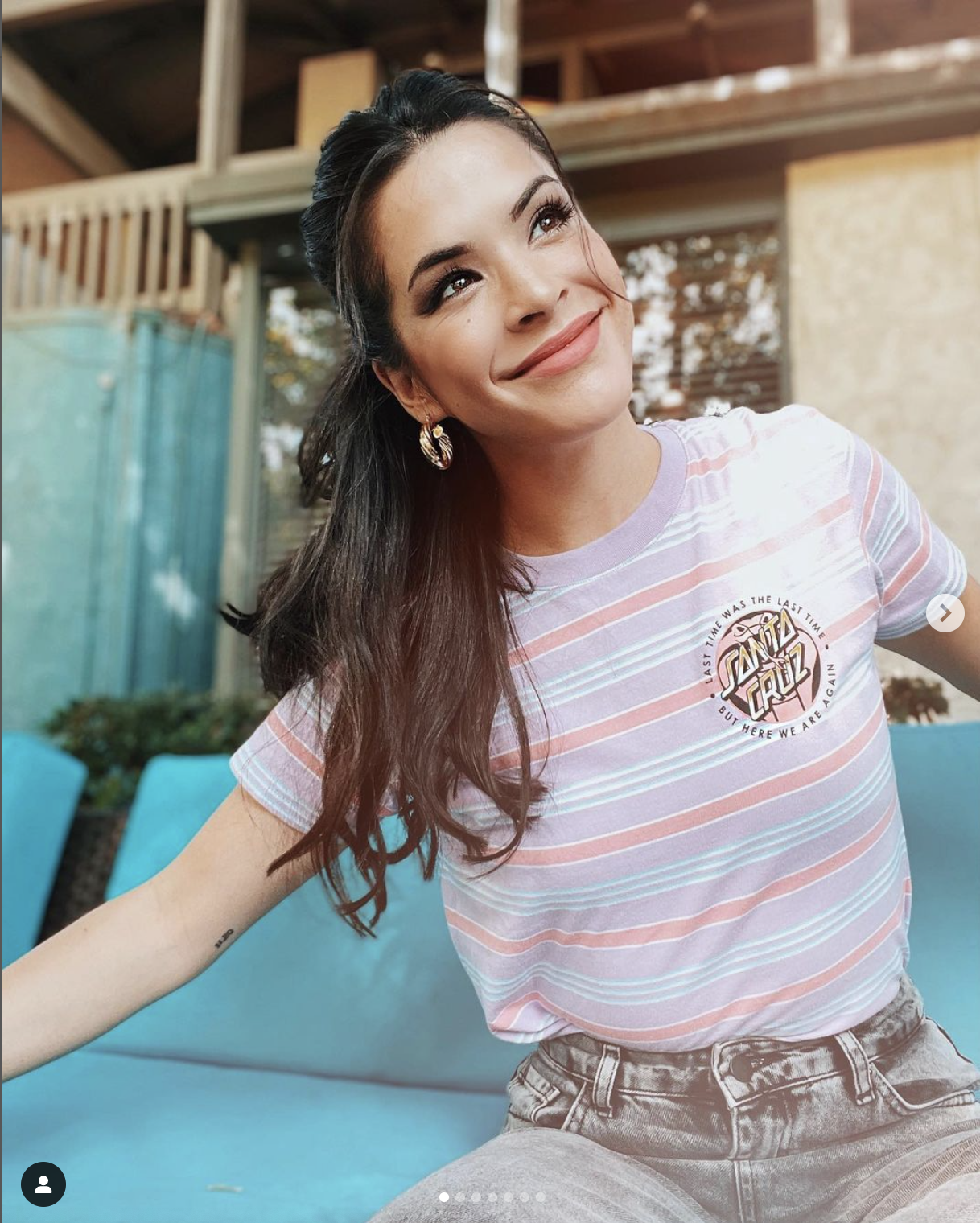
- Okumura in 2022
- Occupations: Voice actress, content creator, musician
- Known for: Scam baiting videos
- Website: rosieokumura.com

Rosie Okumura is an American voice actress, content creator, and musician based in Los Angeles. She creates scambaiting videos that combine humor, voice acting, and educational content to expose and counteract fraudulent schemes.

== Career ==
Okumura is a musician in the band, MODERNS. She is a voice actor and content creator in Los Angeles, California. Her voice acting techniques are self-taught, though she eventually pursued formal training, focusing on commercial copy. Having lived in various states, she found it natural to pick up different dialects and accents. Okumura incorporates her voice acting in scambaiting activities. Her entry into scambaiting was prompted by a personal experience in 2019 when her mother fell victim to a computer virus scam. The scammers gained remote access to her mother's computer and attempted to steal US$500 (equivalent to $629.64 in 2025), along with sensitive personal information. Although the bank blocked the transaction, the incident motivated Okumura to confront the scammers herself.

Her first scambaiting session was livestreamed on Facebook, where she humorously interacted with scammers by impersonating different characters. Encouraged by audience reactions, she began regularly creating and sharing similar content online. Since then, Okumura has produced over 200 scambaiting videos, which have attracted an audience on platforms like YouTube and TikTok. She reached one million subscribers on YouTube in a year.

Okumura's videos combine humor and educational messages to raise awareness about scams and their evolving tactics, including those exploiting advanced technology like artificial intelligence. Her impressions, which include AI-like voices and exaggerated characters, are central to her content. She impersonates celebrities, such as Britney Spears or Kim Kardashian, and uses characters like children or elderly individuals to engage with scammers. These interactions typically last from a few minutes to two hours, during which her primary goal is to prevent scammers from victimizing others. In addition to creating content, she collaborates with volunteers to support scam victims and report fraudulent activities to authorities. Her work has also involved collaborations with other scambaiters, including Trilogy Media, DEYO, Jim Browning, and Kitboga.

== Filmography ==
=== Video games ===
Year	Title	Role	Ref
2025	Yakuza 0 Director's Cut	Additional voices	
