= United Nations University Paris Office =

United Nations University Office

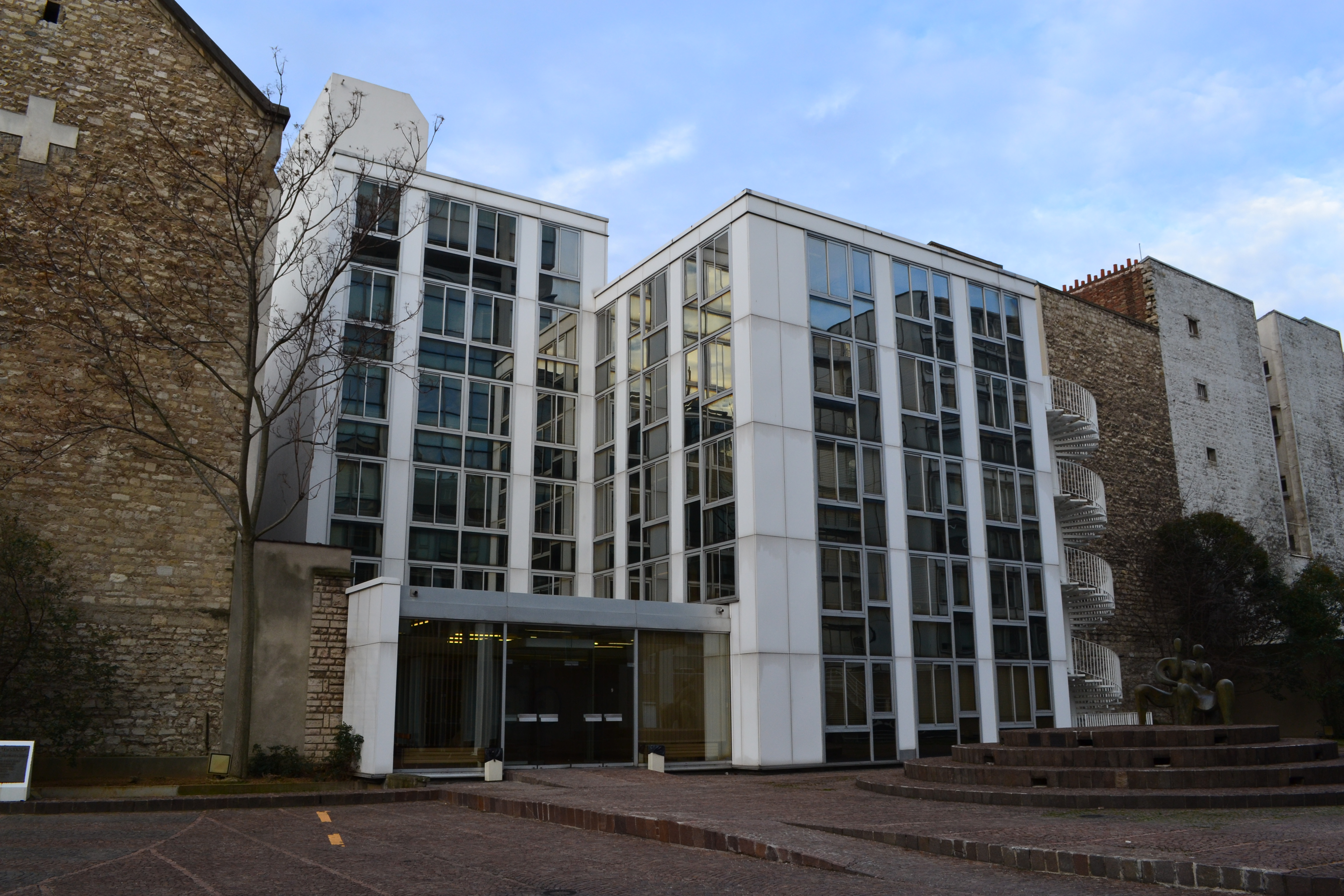
UNU Office at UNESCO building

The United Nations University Paris Office (UNU Paris Office), also known as the United Nations University Office at UNESCO (UNU-OP), serves as academic interface between the United Nations University (UNU) and its Institutes and UNESCO and its Permanent Delegations in Paris, France. The UNU Office at UNESCO also develops contacts between UNU and other Paris-based international organisations as well with French academia.

The aim of the UNU Office at UNESCO is to make UNU a stakeholder and a full-fledged partner of the UNESCO system and the diplomatic environment in Paris. The Office seeks to strengthen existing cooperation and to explore potential joint projects in areas of mutual interest to the two organisations.

To this end, the UNU Office at UNESCO organises public events aimed at presenting UNU's activities. It represents UNU at meetings of UNESCO, particularly the spring session of the Executive Board and the General Conference, major world conferences as well as more informal meetings.
