= List of Sakamoto Days characters =

Group image featuring key characters from the series

The manga series Sakamoto Days features an extensive cast of characters created by Yuto Suzuki.

== Sakamoto's Convenience Store ==
=== Taro Sakamoto ===
Voiced by: Tomokazu Sugita (Japanese); Matthew Mercer (English)
Portrayed by: Ren Meguro

Sakamoto Tarō (坂本 太郎) is a legendary ex-hitman who gave up a life of wealth and crime to marry Aoi, now working as a humble convenience store owner. He has gained a lot of weight, and has become more laid-back, but still has his superhuman skill and strength from his hitman days, though he is now 30% of his prime. During extreme situations, he can lose all his fat and becomes skinny, becoming twice as powerful as before.

=== Shin Asakura ===
Voiced by: Nobunaga Shimazaki, Mutsumi Tamura (child) (Japanese); Dallas Liu, Anne Yatco (child) (English)
Portrayed by: Fumiya Takahashi

Shin Asakura (朝倉 シン, Asakura Shin) is a 21-year old former hitman and esper who used to be Sakamoto's protégé, and eventually works for him at his convenience store after failing to assassinate him and wanting to experience his mundane life. He is known as Shin the Clairvoyant because he has the ability to read minds, though his esper abilities would continuously evolve throughout the course of the series. A running gag is Sakamoto imagining killing him when he annoys him, which Shin always senses, to his dismay.

=== Lu Xiaotang ===
Voiced by: Ayane Sakura (Japanese); Rosalie Chiang (English)
Portrayed by: Mayuu Yokota

Lu Xiaotang (陸 少糖, Rū Shaotan) (Note: Spelled 'Shaotang' in the anime adaptation.) is the 18-year-old daughter of a Chinese mob boss. She is airheaded, but can be analytical and competent when necessary. While she does not do much fighting, she is very capable, as she uses a fighting style that mixes Tai Chi with Drunken Fist. She becomes a store employee after Sakamoto and Shin saves her from the mobs who were hunting her inheritance.

=== Aoi Sakamoto ===
Voiced by: Nao Tōyama (Japanese); Rosie Okumura (English)
Portrayed by: Aya Ueto

Aoi Sakamoto (坂本 葵, Sakamoto Aoi) is Sakamoto's wife. Their relationship begins when he falls in love with her at first sight while she is working as a cashier. Her presence and unconditional love, offered despite his past as a hitman, compel him to abandon his violent profession.

=== Hana Sakamoto ===
Voiced by: Hina Kino (Japanese); Grace Lu (English)
Portrayed by: Miyu Yoshimoto

Sakamoto Hana (坂本 花) is Sakamoto and Aoi's 6-year-old daughter.

=== Heisuke Mashimo ===
Voiced by: Ryōta Suzuki (Japanese); Xolo Maridueña (English)
Portrayed by: Junki Tozuka

Heisuke Mashimo (眞霜 平助, Mashimo Heisuke) is a hitman who specializes in sniping. He is very gullible and hyperemotional, but his skills with a sniper rifle easily make up for it, even holding the all-time record at the JCC (Japan Clear Creation) (anonymously, due to simply forgetting to write his name). After his encounter and encouragement from Sakamoto, he becomes a regular in his shop, and sometimes his scout. He also has a pet parrot acting as his spotter, named Piisuke (ピー助) (voiced by Miyari Nemoto).

== JAA and JCC ==
=== The Order ===
==== Yoichi Nagumo ====
Voiced by: Natsuki Hanae (Japanese); Aleks Le (English)
Portrayed by: Takumi Kitamura

Yoichi Nagumo (南雲 与市, Nagumo Yōichi) is Sakamoto's old colleague and classmate in the JCC who would serve as an Order member with Sakamoto until his retirement. He is very cheerful and casual, which bely his skill, and he enjoys antagonizing his fellow Order members. He locates Sakamoto after he gains a bounty and does what he can to maintain Sakamoto's peaceful life while still serving as an Order member. After he gets framed by Oki he joins Sakamoto's side fully. His weapon of choice is a multipurpose tool with various types of blades, and is also highly skilled at disguising himself as other people.

==== Shishiba ====
Voiced by: Taku Yashiro (Japanese); Keith Silverstein (English)
Portrayed by: Yūsei Yagi

Shishiba (神々廻) is a member of the Order. He is cynical, strict, and hates onions with a murderous passion, but cares deeply for his fellow Order members, especially his mentee Osaragi. His highly professional nature often clashes with his peers' casual attitudes. His weapon of choice is a hammer.

==== Osaragi ====
Voiced by: Saori Hayami (Japanese); Xanthe Huynh (English)
Portrayed by: Meru Nukumi

Osaragi (大佛) is the youngest member of the Order who only recently joined. Shishiba serves as a sort of mentor to her. She is childish, mischievous, often fretful, and rather gullible, but ruthless as a killer, although her immature side would get her to be afraid of simple scary things such as being frightened by Natsuki as a ghost due to his invisibility suit. She has a great love for food, especially snacks. Her weapon of choice is a large circular saw.

==== Hyo ====
Voiced by: Hiroki Yasumoto (Japanese); Imari Williams (English)

Hyo (豹, Hyō) is a member of the Order. He is harsh but cares for the safety of others above all else; Nagumo enjoys antagonizing him due to this tsundere nature. His weapon of his choice is a pair of brass knuckles.

==== Takamura ====
Voiced by: Hōchū Ōtsuka (Japanese); Keythe Farley (English)

Takamura (篁), the most formidable assassin in the Japan Assassin Association (JAA), appears as a frail, lethargic old man yet wields a katana with superhuman speed and precision. His overwhelming combat prowess—far surpassing even elite assassins like Sakamoto—renders him less a human fighter and more an unstoppable force of nature.

==== Kanaguri ====
Voiced by: Satoshi Hino (Japanese); Crispin Freeman (English)

Kanaguri (京) is a member of the Order who secretly works for X. He is an eccentric movie director famous for movies about assassins; his passion is so great he will unhesitatingly kill anyone who insults movies. He has no particular loyalty towards X, only following him so he may create a movie about a battle between X and the JAA, with no care as to who wins. His weapon of choice is a bladed clapperboard and a heat-ray camera, which he also uses to help visualize his fighting as action choreography.

==== Kindaka ====
Kindaka (キンダカ) is the co-founder of the Order alongside Satoru Yotsumura, who usually handled the disposal of problem students from the JCC. After Sakamoto, Rion, Nagumo and Uzuki are sent his way, he is impressed by their skills and recruits them for a special mission, during which Uzuki reveals himself as the enemy and puts him in a coma. He awakens seven years later and would assist in Sakamoto's takeover plan of the JAA starting with training Shin and Heisuke. His weapon of choice are the Onsoku, a pair of customized children's shoes that allows him to move in the speed of light.

==== Kamihate ====
Kamihate (上終) is a member of the Order, who is recognized as the greatest sniper in JAA history. Extremely unsociable and preferring not to interact with associates face-to-face, Kamihate is a shut-in, whose face not even the other Order members have seen. When forced to collaborate, Kamihate goes so far as to have a fellow Order member carry a hiragana chart on a paper so that, if the sniper wishes to say something, he can simply shoot at the corresponding characters from afar to formulate messages.

==== Oki ====
Oki (沖) is the current head of the Order, known for his strict adherence to its rules. He was abroad on an unspecified assignment until Uzuki's assault on the JAA museum prompted his return to Japan. His weapon of choice is an ornately decorated naginata.

==== Torres ====
Torres (トーレス, Tōresu) is a Hispanic middle-aged assassin with great durability and an extreme gambling addiction, who gets recruited by Oki to fill in the empty spots of the Order. His weapons of choice is a pair of sandblasters.

==== Tanabata ====
Tanabata (七夕) is a teenage assassin who turns his kills into songs to amuse himself, while playing the guitar, who gets recruited by Oki to fill in the empty spots of the Order. His weapon of choice is a guitar, which can turn into a rifle.

==== Saionji Siblings ====
Shiina Saionji (西園寺 椎名, Saionji Shiina) and her older brother Kippei Saionji (西園寺 桔平, Saionji Kippei) are a pair of young assassins, who graduated from the Kyoto Kansai Killing Academy, who get scouted by Gozu and Torres to join Slur's New Order. Shiina's weapon of choice is a minigun that can convert into a sledgehammer, while Kippei wields a kanabō.

=== JCC Students / Trainees ===
==== Akira Akao ====
Voiced by: M.A.O (Japanese); Oshún Ramirez (English)

Akira Akao (赤尾 晶, Akao Akira) is a very timid and anxious niece of Rion Akao who befriends Sakamoto during the JCC entrance exam. She is good at housework, adverse to violence, and seemingly has no instincts as an assassin, but in truth, has great speed and reflexes, and seems to visualize a "path" she can follow to kill opponents, similar to her aunt. She joins the JCC for information on Rion's whereabouts, and joins with Sakamoto, Shin, and Natsuki to locate the student database. She later abandons the group in order to avenge Rion for her death in Uzuki's hands, but upon discovering her relationship with him and Asaki's involvement (and also meeting his Rion personality), she decides to aid him in fear of losing her again, but she is warned by the Rion personality to flee, as Uzuki does not have full control and they are just replicas.

==== Natsuki Seba ====
Voiced by: Nobuhiko Okamoto (Japanese); Stephen Fu (English)
Portrayed by: Keisuke Watanabe

Natsuki Seba (勢羽 夏生, Seba Natsuki) is a sarcastic, dry, and rather blunt 19-year-old student in the research department who temporarily worked for Kashima as an enforcer. He is the older brother of Mafuyu. Natsuki is known amongst his peers as a prodigious weapons maker, and has created countless inventions and prototypes of varying success. He and Shin get on each other's nerves, but work surprisingly well together, and ally to locate the student database. Natsuki's fighting skills are only average, but he utilizes a suit he created that grants invisibility to anything it covers, making him a tricky opponent.

==== Mafuyu Seba ====
Voiced by: Daiki Yamashita (Japanese); Griffin Burns (English)

Mafuyu Seba (勢羽 真冬, Seba Mafuyu) is a germaphobic, easily agitated 14-year-old boy who aspires to be an assassin and participates in the JCC entrance exam. Despite his age, he is highly skilled and ruthless, remaining calm during battle. He is the younger brother of Natsuki. His weapons of choice are blades built into his boots, as he hates getting his hands dirty.

==== Nao Toramaru ====
Voiced by: Hisako Kanemoto (Japanese); Lizzie Freeman (English)

Nao Toramaru (虎丸 尚, Toramaru Nao) is an obsessive fan of Sakamoto that participates in the JCC entrance exam. Her obsession is so great, she even views Sakamoto as a god, and targets Shin when she realizes he admires Sakamoto as well, though not realizing their connection. Her weapon of choice is a rifle with an axe blade.

==== Joichiro Kaji ====
Voiced by: Tomoaki Maeno (Japanese); Daman Mills (English)

Joichiro Kaji (加耳 丈一郎, Kaji Jōichirō) is a shy young man who participates in the JCC entrance exam. He has highly sensitive hearing, able to pick out distinct, faint sounds even amongst static.

==== Amane Yotsumura ====
Voiced by: Kikunosuke Toya

Amane Yotsumura (四ツ村 周, Yotsumura Amane) is an impassive and cynical student in the assassination department. Despite his outwardly cold personality, he is rather sincere, willing to apologize when he is mistaken, and gets along very well with his peers. He is the son of Yotsumura and Byodo's grandson, who he loathes for killing his mother. Amane collaborates with Uzuki to bring down the JAA and have the opportunity to kill Yotsumura, but turns against him when his fellow students are caught in the conflict. His weapon of choice is a bladed, four-sectioned staff, and he is also highly perceptive. He also inherited his grandfather's superhuman memory, although it is not as accurate as his.

==== Jay Erk / Kill Baby ====
Voiced by: Ryuichi Kijima (Japanese); Bill Butts (English)

Jay Erk (ヤナヤ・ツー, Yanaya Tsū), (Note: His name is given as Jack Cass in the anime.) also known as Kill Baby (キル・ベイビー, Kiru Beibī) is an overconfident man who participates in the JCC entrance exam, despite the fact that he has failed the same exam four times prior. He is teamed up with Sakamoto and Akira during the exam and seems to pass every challenge with simply good luck.

==== Shinaya ====
Voiced by: Tatsumaru Tachibana (Japanese); Jonathon Ha (English)

Shinaya (軟柔) is one of the three Special Recommendations for the JCC test, renowned as an exceptionally skilled and adaptable fighter. However, unbeknownst to the examiners, Gaku was secretly remote-controlling Shinaya's body during the test—using him as a proxy to scout potential JCC recruits for Slur's group.

=== JCC Alumni and Staff ===
==== Rion Akao ====
Voiced by: Mamiko Noto (Japanese); Allegra Clark (English)

Rion Akao (赤尾 リオン, Akao Rion) is a skilled assassin and Sakamoto's classmate at the JCC, possessing the ability to perceive lethal "paths", a trait shared by her niece, Akira. During a mission with Uzuki, she vanishes after confronting him, leaving him comatose. Though presumed dead, her JCC account later issues Sakamoto's billion-yen bounty. After her death, Uzuki's guilt manifests as a subconscious persona of Rion, who acts as Kei's protector in combat. Occasionally taking control of Kei's body, her behavior arouses suspicion from Byodo and Kashima. Seeking to prevent further destruction, the Rion persona places the bounty on Sakamoto, unaware he has retired.

==== Byodo ====
Voiced by: Kenyu Horiuchi

Byodo (廟堂, Byōdo) is the janitor at the JCC, Yotsumura's father-in-law, and Amane's grandfather. Unlike Amane, he does not desire revenge against Yotsumura, and is very close with Amane and cares for Amane's well-being. He is a capable assassin, but his greatest asset is his superhuman memory, able to remember every detail about every student who attended the JCC after him, earning him the nickname "Database".

==== Etsuko Satoda ====
Voiced by: Misa Watanabe

Etsuko Satoda (佐藤田 悦子, Satōda Etsuko), more often referred to simply as "Satoda-sensei", is a JCC teacher. Along with her longtime friend and classmate Byodo, she has been at the JCC the longest as an instructor, even teaching during Sakamoto's time there. Though Satoda is skilled enough to earn an invitation to join the Order, she turned it down, deciding that fostering and protecting her students is more important. Though retired, she is an aikido master, specializing in redirecting and nullifying attacks.

==== Usami ====
Voiced by: Kengo Takanashi (Japanese); Darius Johnson (English)

Usami (宇佐美) is the lazy and careless head examiner for the JCC transfer exam.

==== Mizuno ====
Voiced by: Ayako Kawasumi (Japanese); Lauren Landa (English)

Mizuno (水野) is one of the examiners for the JCC transfer exam, who poses as a flight attendant on Kill Airlines.

==== Ato ====
Voiced by: Mari Hino (Japanese); Xanthe Huynh (English)

Ato (阿藤, Atō) is a proactive examiner for the JCC transfer exam, who wields a rope with blades attached.

=== JAA Staff ===
==== Sei Asaki ====
Sei Asaki (麻樹 栖, Asaki Sei) is the current JAA Chairman and the older adoptive brother of Kei, who used his brother's infiltration mission to wrestle the chairman seat in the past.

==== Erio Muto ====
Erio Muto (ミュートー アーリオー, Muto Erio) is a JAA executive, who has ambitions to replace Asaki as chairman.

=== JAA Prison ===
==== Atari ====
Atari (辺リ) is a childish esper that serves as the JAA's fortune teller, with 80% of the organizations actions depending entirely on her predictions, which are luckily 100% accurate.

==== Jo Shackles ====
Jo Shackles (枷 錠, Kase Jō) is the bipolar guard of the first level of the JAA prison. He is a competent combatant, as he needs to keep prisoners in check, and his main weapon is a handcuff on a long chain.

==== Daikyō ====
Daikyō (大凶) is one of Atari's prison guards on B3, who frequently relies on Atari's predictions due to his terrible luck.

==== Hoshi ====
Hoshi (星) is one of Atari's prison guards on B3, who also acts as her bodyguard.

== X's Organization ==
=== Kei Uzuki / X ===
Voiced by: Daisuke Namikawa (Japanese); Vinnie Hacker (English)
Portrayed by: Jun Shison

Kei Uzuki (有月 憬, Uzuki Kei), also known as "X" or "Slur", is a serial killer targeting assassins in an attempt to dismantle the JAA, believing his actions will purify society. His philosophy attracts followers who revere him as a messianic figure. Though coldly focused on his mission, he shows warmth toward his subordinates. Once reluctant to kill, he becomes ruthless after Rion Akao's death—a loss orchestrated by his brother Asaki—abandoning his former morality. His survival against Sakamoto, Nagumo, and Akira is due to a rare congenital condition where his organs are inversely positioned. Trauma from losing loved ones, including Rion and Haruma, causes him to develop dissociative identities, manifesting as Rion and a violent Takamura persona he struggles to control.

=== Gaku ===
Voiced by: Koki Uchiyama (Japanese); Jacob Bertrand (English)

Gaku (楽) is a member of X's crew and his right-hand man. He is highly lackadaisical towards everything, even killing. A very relaxed man, he is often seen sleeping or playing video games when he is not in combat. His weapon of choice is a mace with a blaster built into the head.

=== Kumanomi ===
Kumanomi (熊埜御) is the only female member of X's crew, who grew up at Al-Kamar orphanage with Uzuki. Her weapon of choice is an electromagnetic glove which she uses to manipulate the metallic objects in her vicinity to her advantage, including the opponents' weapons.

=== Haruma ===
Haruma (ハルマ) is a member of X's crew from Al-Kamar orphanage, who is well versed in various sports, using their intricate movement sets to fight.

=== Tenkyu ===
Tenkyu (天弓) is a psychopathic eyepatch-wearing member of X's crew from Al-Kamar orphanage, who infiltrates the JAA prison. According to Uzuki, he is the only member who succeeds on meeting Al-Kamar's criteria of killing with no emotions. His weapon of choice is a customized compound bow.

=== Gozu ===
Gozu (牛頭) is an aloof, carefree man and the oldest member of X's crew from Al-Kamar orphanage. His weapons of choice are metallic claw-like gloves, with which he can freely conduct electricity.

=== Kashima ===
Voiced by: Kazuyuki Okitsu (Japanese); Daman Mills (English)
Portrayed by: Akihisa Shiono

Kashima (鹿島) is a cyborg who works for X. He wears a reindeer mask that cover his heavily stitched face and lilac hair with dark purple streaks. He believes killing is justified under X's doctrine. His weapon of choice are various weaponry installed inside his body.

=== Club Jam ===
Voiced by: Kishō Taniyama

Club Jam (クラブ・ジャム, Kurabu Jamu) is a playful masochist with dreadlocks who believes being close to death is when people are most human and constantly seeks to have himself tortured for this experience. He is a skilled hypnotist, who triggers commands through clapping, and his weapon of choice is a crescent-shaped blade on a chain.

=== Carolina Reaper ===
Voiced by: Kazuya Nakai (Japanese); Ben Diskin (English)

Carolina Reaper (キャロライナ・リーパー, Kyaroraina Rīpā) is a very harsh assassin whom Club Jam refers to as his older brother. True to his name, he loves to eat spicy peppers, but appears to not be able to handle the spice. He has the ability to breathe fire with a torch.

=== Mad Horiguchi ===
Voiced by: Setsuji Satō (Japanese); Todd Haberkorn (English)

Mad Horiguchi (マッド 堀口, Maddo Horiguchi) is a maniacal scientist who works for X through Kashima. He often experiments on himself as well and uses various medical tools, such as syringes in battle.

=== Uda ===
Voiced by: Masaya Matsukaze (Japanese); Landon McDonald (English)

Uda (宇田) is a cyborg with a bomb planted through his body that is one of Uzuki's followers, who goes undercover as an office worker in the JAA main building. He then detonates himself to help Uzuki escape from Takamura.

== Death Row Serial Killers ==
=== Dump ===
Voiced by: Yūko Kaida, Reo Osanai^{Ep. 13 credits} (young) (Japanese); Tiana Camacho (English)

Dump (ダンプ, Danpu) is a convicted serial killer on death row who murders individuals she develops affection for, believing this preserves their attention eternally. Her primary weapons consist of retractable spikes protruding from her body. She is ultimately killed by Osaragi during a confrontation.

=== Saw ===
Voiced by: Kohsuke Toriumi (Japanese); David Vincent (English)

Saw (ソウ, Sou) is a convicted serial killer on death row, he murders victims under the delusion of granting them "satisfying" life conclusions. His signature weapon consists of an axe attached to a rope. Following his defeat by Shin and Shaotang, he attempts to flee but is ultimately killed by Hyo during the escape attempt.

=== Apart ===
Voiced by: Chiaki Kobayashi, Natsumi Fujiwara (young) (Japanese); Erik Scott Kimerer (English)

Apart (アパート, Apāto) is a convicted serial killer on death row murders victims in an attempt to "see inside" them, believing this enables personal connection. He employs steel wires as weapons to dismember targets. After being defeated, he betrays Slur and briefly allies with Sakamoto before being swiftly overpowered by Slur, with his ultimate fate left unresolved.

=== Minimalist ===
Voiced by: Ryōta Takeuchi (Japanese); Daniel Walton (English)

Minimalist (ミニマリスト, Minimarisuto) is a convicted serial killer on death row who commits murders primarily to relieve his ennui. His distinctive method involves crushing objects and victims into compact spheres using his bare hands. During an attempt to target Sakamoto, he is ultimately killed by Nagumo, who was operating under the disguise of Aoi at the time.

== Other characters ==
=== Boiled ===
Voiced by: Yasuhiro Mamiya (Japanese); SungWon Cho (English)
Portrayed by: Shinya Kote

Boiled (ボイルド, Boiredo) is a former classmate of Sakamoto who is affiliated with the assassin agency Dondenkai, seeking to hunt down Sakamoto during his family trip to the Amusement Park. His weapon is choice are Super Ball Bombs, a pair of small explosives and the Rocket Dynamite Punch, the finishing move of his handmade gauntlet that increase the power of his punches. After his defeat in the hands of Sakamoto, he becomes involved in illegal jobs which brought him to get arrested and ending up in JAA prison, where he meets Shin and becomes their ally again.

=== Lu Wutang ===
Voiced by: Masaaki Mizunaka (Japanese); Howard Wang (English)

Lu Wutang (魯 武堂, Rū Wūtan) is a member of the same Triad Lu Xiaotang formerly belonged to and her former bodyguard. He is a weak fighter, but is vastly intelligent and a master strategist, which he has used alone to rise through the Triad ranks. This rather passive approach has drawn the disapproval of other members. Wutang grew up with Lu, who he has a massive crush on due to being the only person to ever encourage him. Though he initially seeks to take Lu back to the Triad, Wutang relents upon seeing her happiness and Sakamoto's skill, and becomes an ally, thus working at the latter's convenience store.

=== Asakura ===
Voiced by: Hiroshi Tsuchida (Japanese); Yong Yea (English)
Portrayed by: Kenjiro Tsuda

Asakura (朝倉) is the head of the laboratory that raised Shin, and his foster father. A scientist who struggles to bring his wild science to fruition, Shin accidentally drank one of Asakura's serums, granting him his telepathy abilities. Shin grew annoyed that Asakura seemed more concerned about his science than his well-being, and ran away from the lab long ago. Despite his apparent coldness towards Asakura, Shin cares about him and respects Asakura for raising him, even using Asakura's name as his own surname.

=== Miya ===
Voiced by: Masako Katsuki (Japanese); Barbara Goodson (English)

Miya (ミヤ) is an elderly holistic healer for assassins and an old acquaintance of Sakamoto's. She is known as "God Hands" in the assassin world.

=== Satoru Yotsumura ===
Voiced by: Shinshū Fuji

Satoru Yotsumura (四ツ村 暁, Yotsumura Satoru) is the co-founder and former member of the Order who was banished for failing an important mission. He is very calm and analytical. His weapon of choice is a bladed, three-sectioned staff.

=== Shino Yotsumura ===
Shino Yotsumura (四ツ村 市の, Yotsumura Shino) is Satoru's wife and Amane's caring mother, who in reality was a cold and loyal assassin.

=== Tasuku Ando ===
Tasuku Ando (安藤 丞, Andō Tasuku) is a former JAA researcher, Asakura's old partner and Shin's biological father, as well as Sakamoto's assassination target during the assignment Sakamoto first meets Shin.

=== Ikari ===
Ikari (怒り) is Ando's bodyguard who has a keen sense of smell, who wields a detached ship anchor on a chain as his weapon of choice.

=== Obiguro ===
Voiced by: Yumi Uchiyama (Japanese); Lexi Cabrera (English)
Portrayed by: Hinako Sakurai

Obiguro (オビグロ) is a seductive woman affiliated with the assassin agency Dondenkai and Boiled's partner.

=== Tatsu ===
Voiced by: Taishi Murata (Japanese); Xander Mobus (English)
Portrayed by: Shintarō Anzai

Tatsu (タツ) is an apathetic assassin from the Dondenkai agency, who is proficient with poisons and chemicals.
