= Trilogy Media =

American YouTubers and scambaiters

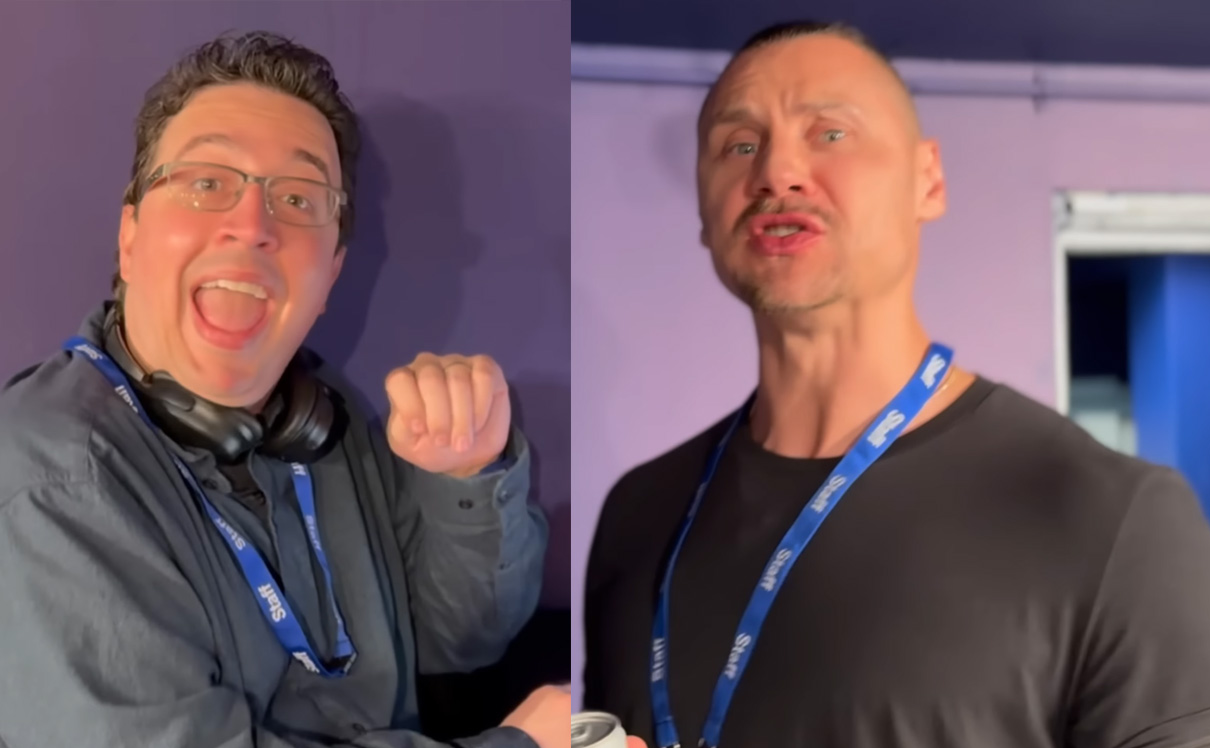
- Trilogy Media in 2025. From left, Ashton Bingham, Art Kulik
- Occupations: YouTuber; scambaiter

YouTube information
- Channel: Trilogy Media
- Years active: 2016–present
- Genres: Scam baiting; Internet vigilantism
- Subscribers: 1.83 million
- Views: 217 million
- Last updated: 14 June 2026
- Website: trilogymedia.com

Trilogy Media is an American YouTube channel and media company/streaming service founded in 2016 by Ashton Bingham and Artsiom "Art" Vladimirovich Kulik (Russian: Артём Кулик). The channel is primarily known for its scambaiting and internet vigilantism content with a focus on exposing scams and fraudulent activities.

== History ==
Bingham and Kulik launched Trilogy Media in 2016, initially producing sketch comedy and short-form entertainment content.

Both founders have backgrounds in film and acting. Bingham is an actor and comedian from Reno, Nevada, and Kulik was born on January 10, 1984, in Siberia and raised in Soviet Belarus. Their prior experience in acting influenced the production quality of their videos. As of 2025, Trilogy Media is based in Los Angeles.

Trilogy Media, in collaboration with Scammer Payback, contributed to the 2025 dismantling of an alleged money mule operation for scam call centers by Chinese nationals in California.

In May 2026, Bingham and Kulik were keynote speakers at the Central Ohio Association of Certified Fraud Examiners (ACFE).

== Content and style ==
Trilogy Media creates content that exposes scammers by using voice changers and false identities during phone calls. With a mix of humor and commentary, they prank call alleged scammers in India to waste their time and prevent real victims from being scammed.

The series Trilogy vs. Predator focuses on investigations into individuals attempting to allegedly exploit minors online, sometimes in coordination with law enforcement and child protection organizations.

== Collaborations and projects ==
In 2022, Trilogy Media collaborated with Scammer Payback on the "People's Call Center" a public initiative designed to raise awareness of online fraud. The channel has also participated in joint efforts with other creators in digital activism and cybersecurity awareness.

Trilogy Media has collaborated with vigilante content creator Skeeter Jean, known for conducting amateur, civilian-led online predator sting operations targeting alleged predators.

In 2025, Trilogy Media released a video titled Exposing Hollywood’s Most Sadistic Director on their streaming platform, TrilogyPlus. The video documents an investigation by content creator Reckless Ben into the filmmaker Lucifer Valentine, known for the Vomit Gore Trilogy. It includes discussion of online claims regarding the director’s identity.

In September 2025, Trilogy Media assisted local and federal law enforcement in Baxter County, Arkansas during an investigation into fraud targeting elderly victims. Two individuals were arrested following a sting coordinated with the Mountain Home Police Department, the Baxter County Sheriff's Office, and the Department of Homeland Security. The operation involved a controlled delivery of $250,000 to intercept participants in the scheme.

== Television ==
In October 2025, Trilogy Media premiered their first network television series, Scammed: Getting Even, on the Fox Nation streaming platform. The six-part documentary television series follows founders Ashton Bingham and Art Kulik as they investigate and confront real-world fraud and scam operations. Each episode examines a different form of fraud, including romance scams, cryptocurrency cons, and refund scams.

=== Television episodes ===
Contents below are adapted from a Fox Nation press release.

No.	Title	Original release date
1	"The Catfish King"	October 22, 2025
The hosts travel to Chattanooga, Tennessee to assist a family concerned about an online romance involving an individual claiming to be a doctor overseas.
2	"The Refund"	October 29, 2025
A case involving a reported PayPal refund scheme leads the team to work with law enforcement in Arkansas during an on-site investigation.
3	"Crypto Con"	November 5, 2025
The hosts look into a cryptocurrency-related complaint involving substantial financial loss.
4	"Click Bait"	November 12, 2025
In cooperation with the Baxter County Sheriff's Office in Arkansas, the team reviews reports concerning pop-up computer support scams affecting older adults.
5	"Dr. Fraud"	November 19, 2025
The hosts with Social Catfish examine a long-distance relationship fraud case reported between residents of Texas and individuals operating overseas.
6	"Fool’s Gold"	November 26, 2025
A complaint involving a gold-investment offer prompts a review of how the scheme was organized and who may have been involved.

== Awards and nominations ==
Year	Award	Category	Result	Ref.
2022	12th Streamy Awards	Collaboration (Note: With Mark Rober and Jim Browning.)	Won	
