= 419eater.com =

Scam baiting website

419eater
- Available in: English
- Creator: Michael Berry
- Website: 419eater.com
- Registration: Required for full functionality
- Launched: September 2003
- Current status: Open

419eater.com is a scam baiting website which focuses on advance-fee fraud. The name 419 comes from "419 fraud", another name for advance fee fraud, and itself derived from the relevant section of the Nigerian criminal code. The website founder, Michael Berry, goes by the alias "Shiver Metimbers". As of 2013, the 419 Eater forum had over 55,000 registered accounts. According to one member, "Every minute the scammer I'm communicating with is spending on me is a minute he is not scamming a real potential victim."

== Concept ==
The website chronicles various reverse scams, known as "baits," with e-mail exchanges between the baiters and the scammers, and commentary by the participants. The site hosts photographs of individuals reported to be scammers in humorous poses, or holding signs such as "I recommend 419eater". These photographs, according to the members who post them, were in most cases obtained during the process of a bait: the baiter, posing as an actual victim, will request the photos from the scammer, who will comply in the belief that the "victim" is about to fall for the scam and send money.

In some cases, the scambaiter claims to have had the scammers send them money with a ploy similar to the original flim flam. This is known informally as cash baiting. According to Berry as documented in some of his successful cash baits, the proceeds of such reverse scams were given to a local charity. Now however, cash-baiting is frowned upon and is against 419eater.com rules, which are rigorously enforced.

The website also includes a message forum and a bulletin board where scambaiters can post messages to communicate with each other. New scambaiters can request to be assigned a "mentor" to assist them in learning how to bait.

The 419eater community previously engaged in the activity of identifying and removing fake banks and other websites created by the scammers from the Internet, as well as shutting down bank accounts used by scammers in the process of their illegal scamming activities. It did this in cooperation with Artists Against 419, which hosts a large, publicly accessible database of fake banks and similar fraudulent websites. In 2020, Artists Against 419 severed its ties with 419eater.com and the Fake Site forum is now locked.

== Notable events in the timeline of the site ==
Berry was a featured guest on BBC Radio 2's The Jeremy Vine Show on November 1, 2006. Berry has also collected some of the scambaits shown on the website, in a book Greetings in Jesus' Name!: The Scambaiter Letters. In early 2008, Berry retired from active involvement in 419eater.com to concentrate on work and other projects, handing control over to one of the site's long-running system administrators.

Beginning September 6, 2007, the 419eater.com website—among other "scam warning" websites—was subjected to a massive botnet DDoS attack which rendered the site unreachable. However, by September 18, 2007, the site and forums were both back online.

419eater and its operatives were profiled on the September 12, 2008 episode of Public Radio International's This American Life, specifically one particular bait that ran for 100 days starting in April 2008 and involved sending a scammer named Adamu from Lagos, Nigeria to Abéché, Chad, a dangerous and politically unstable region.

419eater.com was quoted as saying "When the scammer sends you a fake passport that looks like it was made by a blind hamster with a piece of charcoal in ten seconds, you praise it and say it really helps you to build trust". Several baiters "talked a scammer into traveling from Port Harcourt, Nigeria to Darfur to pick up a nonexistent $500,000. The 3,000-mile roundtrip got the scammer stranded for two weeks before he managed to make it home". Although the work of 419eater.com baiters does put scammers in danger, "the general consensus...was that they feel even the most dangerous of safaris is payback for all the scammers do. 'The scammer makes the decision to put themselves in harm's way; if something happens to them, so be it. Most of them would have no problem with you dying if it meant that they would make a dollar'". Another baiter was quoted as saying "Whether he is wandering through the desert hundreds of miles from home, or making yet another fruitless trip to the Moneygram office, that's all time he is not behind a computer scamming someone's elderly parents."

In January 2014, members of 419eater.com appeared in two segments of the Channel 4 series Secrets of the Scammers. In the first segment, scambaiters persuaded a scammer to travel from London to a remote location in Cornwall by train and taxi, to meet a victim (played by a baiter) and collect payment for a gold deal. In the second segment, a female scammer met with two scambaiters posing as victims in Trafalgar Square, to pass them a fake check. This scammer was subsequently questioned by the police.

In November 2014, members of 419eater.com appeared in a segment of the CBC Television series Dot.Con. During the segment, a scambaiter persuaded a scammer to travel from Paris to a remote location in Cornwall by air and taxi, to meet a victim (played by a baiter) and collect payment for a gold deal. Following this, two scammers travelled from London and met with a scambaiter posing as a victim in Plymouth to collect upfront payment for delivery of a trunk box of cash.

== See also ==
- List of scams § Online scams
