= Nevaeh =

Given name

- Pronunciation: /nəˈveɪ.ə/ nə-VAY-ə
- Gender: Female

Origin
- Origin: English
- Meaning: "Heaven" backwards
- Region of origin: United States

Other names
- Nicknames: Neve, Nivie, Nieve, Nev, Vae
- Related names: Heaven

Nevaeh is a feminine given name which was coined by spelling heaven backwards. It peaked in popularity in the 2000s and 2010s but remains one of the most popular girls' names as of 2020.

== History and meaning ==
The name Nevaeh is the word heaven spelled backwards. An erroneous belief is that the name has an Irish origin, a variation of the name Niamh, which is still common in Ireland today.

Nevaeh was a rare given name before singer Sonny Sandoval of the rock group P.O.D. named his daughter Nevaeh in 2000. He was then featured in the fall of that year on the television program MTV Cribs, and use of the name became widespread. India began utilizing the Nevaeh name in 2013 as well.

Nevaeh first entered the top 1000 names for girls born in the United States in 2001 when its popularity shot up making it the 266th most common name, according to the US Social Security Administration. By 2010, it was the 25th most popular given name overall for all girls born in the United States in that year. It was the third most popular name for Black girls born in New York City in 2010 and the third most popular name given to girls born in 2010 in New Mexico, the state where it is most popular; Nevaeh did not appear among the top 10 names in any other state in that year. In 2007 it was the top name among black girls born in Colorado. The name has since declined in popularity but remained among the top 100 most popular names for girls in the United States in 2020.

Though the name's use the first year or two of its popularity can probably be attributed to Sonny Sandoval's daughter, the further spread of Nevaeh's popularity since is in large part an Internet phenomenon. The name is widely known and discussed, both positively and negatively, on baby naming boards.

Variants of the name are also in use, reflecting different pronunciations in use. Among the variants in use in recent years for American girls are Naveah, Navya, Nava, Navaeh, Navaya, Navayah, Naveyah, Navah, Naviah, Navea, Naveya, Naviyah, Naviya, Neveah, Nevayah, Nevaeha, Neviah, Neveyah, and Nevae. Variants have also been influenced by current fashionable sound patterns for American names.

== People ==
- Nevaeh (wrestler), stage name of Beth Crist (born 1986), American wrestler
- Nevaeh Sandoval, daughter of American singer, rapper, and songwriter Sonny Sandoval

=== Fictional character ===
- Nevaeh, played by Chloe Coleman in the TV series Upload
- Neveah Stroyer, played by Kylie Jefferson in the Netflix series Tiny Pretty Things
- Nevaeh, a valley girl played by streamer and scambaiter Kitboga
