= Uday Challu =

Indian businessman

Uday Challu is the co-founder and CEO of iYogi Technical Services, a Gurgaon-based Indian remote tech support company serving customers mainly in North America.

The Washington State Attorney General's Office reported on April 19 2018 that it had obtained information indicating that "iYogi India has shed most or all of its employees and is largely defunct [...] The company's U.S.-based operation appears to have shut down entirely."

He co-founded IQ Resource, a business media and information services company. With his partner and iYogi co-founder Vishal Dhar, Challu was listed among Asia's 25 Hottest People in Business in 2012, by Fortune Magazine.

Holding an Economics degree from Delhi University, Challu started his career in 1984 as an executive with CAL Systems, a Delhi-based computer hardware company, where he worked for six years with a short break trying his hands on third-party desktop support business. In 1990, he ventured into an apparel business which he sold in 1995 after opening four outlets in Delhi.

In the late nineties, Challu had short stints with two companies: Newgen Software Technologies. In 1999, he co-founded Concordia Consulting providing management consultancy to media and technology companies looking to explore and setup businesses internationally.

Challu also serves on the board of Wizcraft, an international entertainment media company based in India.
