= Karl Rock =

New Zealand YouTube personality and blogger (born 1982)

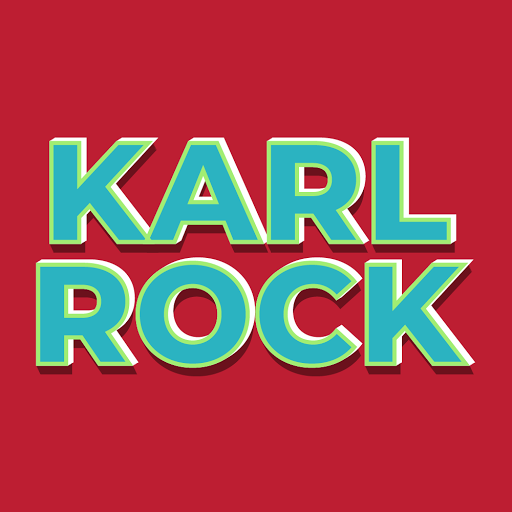
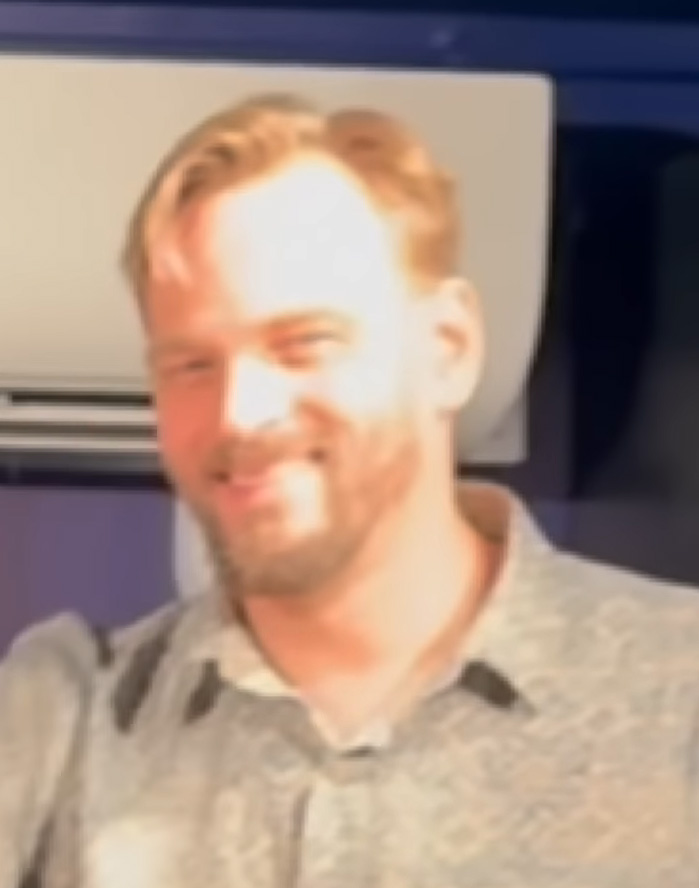
- Karl Rock in 2025
- Born: Karl Edward Rice; 1982 (age 43–44); Auckland, New Zealand
- Occupations: YouTuber; blogger
- Spouse: Manisha Malik (m. 2019)

YouTube information
- Channel: Karl Rock
- Years active: 2017–present
- Genres: Vlogs, educational videos
- Subscribers: 3.19 million
- Views: 1.26 billion
- Last updated: 12 August, 2026
- Website: karlrock.com

Karl Edward Rice, known online as Karl Rock, is a New Zealand blogger and YouTuber based in India. He is best known for his vlogs, which are centred around his travels in the Indian subcontinent, and his book How to Travel in India.

== Early and personal life ==
Rock was born in 1982 in Auckland, New Zealand where he attended and graduated from the University of Auckland. He frequently travelled to India. In 2019, he married Manisha Malik, an Indian woman from Haryana; he resided with Malik in Delhi until his blacklisting by the Government of India in 2020, which cancelled his travel visa. Rock holds dual citizenship of New Zealand and the Netherlands.

During the COVID-19 pandemic, Rock received public praise on Twitter from Arvind Kejriwal, the chief minister of Delhi, for his efforts in donating plasma at a donation bank of the Government of Delhi.

== BBC Panorama investigation ==
As part of an investigation with BBC Panorama, Rock teamed up with Jim Browning, a scambaiter and fellow YouTuber, for a joint infiltration into a large-scale technical support scamming operation in the Indian city of Gurgaon, Haryana. The duo recorded footage of the scamming facility via drones and CCTV, and also downloaded 7000 scam-call recording files from the scammers' computers. Their investigation video series was centred around the tendency of scammers to target elderly people and computer-illiterates in countries such as the United Kingdom, the United States, and locally in the Indian subcontinent.

== India blacklisting controversy ==
In July 2021, Rock uploaded a video on YouTube explaining that his travel visa was cancelled shortly after he left India in October 2020 to travel to Pakistan through Dubai. Upon his attempts to apply for a new visa in Dubai, he was informed that he had been blacklisted by the Government of India and was prohibited from re-entering India. He had last entered the country in November 2019. Rock stated that there was no official reason provided by the Indian government for his blacklisting and that he had not received any response from India's Ministry of Home Affairs following his attempts to contact them. In a statement, India's Ministry of External Affairs and Ministry of Home Affairs stated that Rock had been blacklisted for "multiple visa violations on his last visit". In the context of the blacklisting, an Indian government official stated that Rock had committed a violation by engaging in business activities while on a tourist visa.

Rock returned to India in April 2022, after the restrictions on his entry into the country had been lifted. Rock had promised in April 2022 to make a video about the specifics of this case, but as of May 2024 he has not done so.
