= IYogi =

Indian technical support firm

iYogi Technical Services Pvt. Ltd.
- Industry: Information technology
- Founded: 2007
- Founders: Uday Challu; Vishal Dhar
- Headquarters: Gurgaon, Haryana, India
- Area served: North America, Europe, Australia, India, UAE
- Key people: Uday Challu (CEO); Vishal Dhar (president of marketing)
- Services: Technical support
- Website: www.iyogi.com

iYogi is a remote technical support firm based in Gurgaon, India. The company has been the subject of numerous lawsuits and claims of misconduct. iYogi was found guilty of technical support scams in United States, after being sued by the Washington state in 2016, and additional litigations from at least six more companies. iYogi was found engaging in non-payment, non-fulfilment of service contracts, misleading customers into buying unneeded software, and falsely claimming affiliation with companies like Microsoft, Apple, and HP.

== History ==
iYogi was co-founded by Uday Challu and Vishal Dhar in 2007. Sequoia Capital, Draper Fisher Jurvetson, Canaan Partners, SAP Ventures, and SVB India Capital Partners are the venture capital firms that have invested in the company. The current serving director on board is Shatrugan Paswan who was appointed on 11 May, 2016.

In 2009 the firm acquired Utah-based Clean Machine Inc. and appointed its founder, Larry Gordon, as President Global Channel Sales. In 2010, iYogi raised US$30 million in Series D round of funding led by Sequoia Capital with follow-on investment from existing investors. Earlier in the same year, the company had secured investment of $15 million from Draper Fisher Jurvetson and others. In July 2014 the Axon Partners and Madison India Capital invested $28 million into the company. As of 2014, iYogi's estimated valuation was $400 million.

The company was found guilty of technical support scams, first being sued by the US state of Washington in 2016, followed by at least six more companies. The company have misled customers into buying unneeded software, falsely claiming affiliation with major companies such as Microsoft, Apple, and HP, non-payment, and non-fulfilment of service contracts.

The Washington State Attorney General's Office reported on April 19, 2018, that it had obtained information indicating that "iYogi India has shed most or all of its employees and is largely defunct ... The company's U.S.-based operation appears to have shut down entirely."

== Location and partnerships ==
In February 2010, IBM signed a data center agreement with iYogi and followed it up with another partnership aimed at supporting the tech support firm's expansion plans in several countries.

iYogi launched its operations in India on 7 March 2013 targeting small and medium businesses, and consumers.

On 9 July 2015, iYogi partnered with the Argo Marketing Group of Lewiston, Maine for its first call center in North America. The company said that it would create 300 jobs. The partnership ended in October, 2015, when Argo Marketing terminated the contract and filed a lawsuit against iYogi to collect about US$72,000; Argo CEO Jason Levesque said that, after taking on 30 employees, it had been paid about half of what it was owed. He said he decided to terminate the agreement "because of a myriad of factors", and that Argo was not interested in further partnerships with iYogi.

== Performance ==
The service was reviewed by Michael Muchmore for PC Mag in April 2014, and was awarded two stars out of five. The review praised the service's low cost, polite staff, and privacy warnings, but found it performed poorly, with limited tools and cleanup, remarking that iYogi was once the value leader, but other services were now preferable in light of its lackluster performance.

In April 2016, Hindustan Times published an article saying that the company was fast losing customers. iYogi employees were reported to have complained about not being paid for over a year and multiple months, and had said that over 2,500 of the 4,000 employees had left in consequence; iYogi said the number was smaller. iYogi CEO Challu spoke of a "cash flow crisis" and a "difficult time in the business cycle", but that the company would get over it, and that people quitting jobs is normal in the industry that has "50-60% attrition rate".

== Reports of misconduct, and legal action ==
iYogi's sales tactics have been criticised. InfoWorld in 2012 published articles under the byline of Robert X. Cringely, used by several InfoWorld writers, about people who called computer support lines thinking they were getting free or under-warranty support from their suppliers, but were in fact talking to iYogi. Attempts were made to sell them subscriptions for $US170 per year, and people were told, untruthfully, that their computers had severe problems. Brian Krebs, formerly a writer for The Washington Post and later a blogger on security, called iYogi and concluded that the company was indeed trying to scare users into subscribing. After this information was first published, other people contacted the author to report similar experiences. Dave Mello, a vice-president of support and services for Kaspersky Lab, reported regular complaints from customers who had been under the impression that they were receiving authorized Kaspersky Lab support. Cringely said about iYogi "How it goes about selling support, however, is not unlike how the Mob markets protection: through fear and intimidation."

In March 2012 antivirus software company Avast! severed its ties with iYogi. Under an agreement that lasted a little more than two years, iYogi had provided online support to Avast! users free-of-cost. Avast! accused iYogi of forcefully selling its online support plans to Avast! users; which the antivirus supplier characterised as unnecessary and expensive. Avast! accused iYogi of, at best, misconduct.

Reports of misleading conduct continued in 2015. Nuance Communications, on hearing that iYogi was selling technical support for their Dragon NaturallySpeaking, in April 2015 clarified that iYogi was not certified by Nuance, suggested "NOT USING the support site for iYogi", and "Be sure that you are using Nuance's technical support".

A false advertising class-action lawsuit was filed in New York against iYogi, Inc. in 2013, and was continuing as of October 2015. The complaint alleged that iYogi deceptively offered "Free PC Diagnostics" and a phone consultation with a "Tech Expert" who will identify and solve computer problems although there is no "credible diagnostic testing", and "virtually every potential customer" receives the same warning about problems that need resolving by iYogi.

Nearly 200,000 of iYogi's existing and previous subscribers alleged that iYogi had violated the US Telephone Consumer Protection Act (TCPA) by aggressive sales tactics, including calling people who had asked to be taken off of the call list. In October 2015 a federal court approved a deal including $40 payments to each of about 189,000 iYogi subscribers if they submit a claim form (a total of about $7.5m, only 8% of the available damages under the TCPA).

iYogi filed Multiple lawsuits in California against critics of the company. iYogi claimed that the critics were violating trademark law and defaming the company.

It was reported on 16 December 2015 that Washington state, US, together with Microsoft and AARP, had filed a lawsuit alleging deceptive business practices under the state Consumer Protection Act and violations of the state Computer Spyware Statute. The state Attorney General said that hundreds if not thousands of Washington residents had been scammed by iYogi. iYogi announced, before responding formally, that the lawsuit was without merit, and that they would have clarified the issues if they had been consulted.

In December 2015 Infinite Computer Solutions sued iYogi for non-payment of invoices worth $6.7 million. According to a court filing of 12 May 2016, iYogi indicated that it would make a settlement offer, but was not at the time in a financial position to do so. In October 2016 a court ruled that iYogi had to pay $7.3 million to Infinite Computer Solutions.

In March 2016 Tata Communications, Bankers Warranty Group, OneCall sued iYogi for breach of contract, non-payment, and other issues. iYogi filed a Notice of Appearance in the Washington State case in late March, and had 60 days from that submission to respond formally. Tata Communications was awarded $1.24m as part of a default judgment against iYogi reported on 21 September 2016. In some of the suits iYogi's attorneys resigned because the company failed to meet court deadlines.

In April 2018, a Washington State court issued judgment in the iYogi lawsuit. In addition to the judgments, iYogi's United States president, Vishal Dahr, agreed to cease the company's illegal practices in Washington State, with $500,000 in suspended penalties. iYogi is now shut down completely, but before they ended operations, the company allegedly told their users that they were still in business. After this last false statement, iYogi has ceased its business operations.

As of July 2020 phishing emails claiming to be from IYogi are still being sent.
