= Escrow =

Arrangement for holding funds by a third party

An escrow is a contractual arrangement in which a third party (the stakeholder or escrow agent) receives and disburses money or property for the primary transacting parties, with the disbursement dependent on conditions agreed to by the transacting parties. Examples include an account established by a broker for holding funds on behalf of the broker's principal or some other person until the consummation or termination of a transaction; or, a trust account held in the borrower's name to pay obligations such as property taxes and insurance premiums. The word derives from the Old French word escroe, meaning a scrap of paper or a scroll of parchment; this indicated the deed that a third party held until a transaction was completed.

== Types ==
Escrow generally refers to money held by a third party on behalf of transacting parties. It is mostly used regarding the purchase of shares of a company. It is best known in the United States in the context of the real estate industry (specifically in mortgages where the mortgage company establishes an escrow account to pay property tax and insurance during the term of the mortgage). Escrow is an account separate from the mortgage account where deposit of funds occurs for payment of certain conditions that apply to the mortgage, usually property taxes and insurance. The escrow agent has the duty to properly account for the escrow funds and ensure that usage of funds is explicitly for the purpose intended. Since a mortgage lender is not willing to take the risk that a homeowner may not pay property taxes, escrow is usually required under the mortgage terms.

Escrow companies are also commonly used in the transfer of high-value personal and business property, such as websites and companies, and in the completion of person-to-person remote auctions.

In the UK escrow accounts are often used during private property transactions to hold solicitors' or licensed conveyancer's clients' money, such as the deposit, until the transaction is completed. Other examples include:

- Purchases of a second-hand car, where the money is held in the name of the buyer in a temporary bank account
- Deposits for a property rental, where the money is released after the tenant moves out
- Provision of construction services, where the money may be released when the building work is completed to a defined standard or when defined parts of the work are completed

=== Internet escrow ===
Internet escrow has existed since the beginning of Internet auctions and commerce. It was one of the many developments that allowed trust to be established in the online sphere.

As with traditional escrow, Internet escrow works by placing money under the control of an independent and licensed third party in order to protect both the buyer and seller in a transaction. When both parties verify that the transaction has been completed according to the terms set, the money is released. If at any point there is a dispute between the parties in the transaction, the process moves along to dispute resolution. The outcome of the dispute resolution process will decide what happens to the money in escrow. With the growth of both business and individual commerce on the web, traditional escrow companies have been supplanted by new technologies.

In the US, the California Department of Business Oversight enacted Internet escrow companies as a licensed class effective 1 July 2001. The first Internet escrow company to be licensed was Escrow.com, founded by Fidelity National Financial in 1999.

In the European Union, the Payment Services Directive, which commenced on 1 November 2009, has for the first time allowed the introduction of very low-cost Internet escrow services that are properly licensed and government-regulated. The regulatory framework in the EU allows these web-based escrow services, which operate along the lines of expensive letter of credit service run by banks for international buyers and sellers, but at a cost in cents rather than thousands of Euros, to enhance security in commercial transactions.

Bogus escrow methods have been employed online. In an effort to persuade a wary Internet auction participant, the perpetrator will propose the use of a third-party escrow service. The victim is unaware that the perpetrator has actually created an escrow site that closely resembles a legitimate escrow service. The victim sends payment to the fraudulent escrow company and ends up receiving nothing in return. Alternatively, a victim may send merchandise to the subject and waits for their payment through the escrow site, which is never received because it is illegitimate. Genuine online escrow companies will be listed on a government register, and users are generally advised not to use an online escrow service without first verifying that it is genuine by independently viewing a government on-line register. Currently, the US Federal Government does not offer a license for online escrow services. However, specific states provide their own license for online escrow services; such as the California Department of Business and the Arizona Department of Financial Institutions.

=== Banking ===
Escrow is used in the field of automatic banking and vending equipment. One example is automated teller machines (ATMs), and is the function that allows the machine to hold the money deposited by the customer separately, and in case they challenge the counting result, the money is returned. Another example is a vending machine, where the customer's money is held in a separate escrow area pending successful completion of the transaction. If a problem occurs and the customer presses the refund button, the coins are returned from escrow; if no problem occurs, they fall into the coin vault of the machine.

=== Intellectual property ===
Source code escrow agents hold source code of software in escrow just as other escrow companies hold cash. Sometimes one may not own or have any rights to the software (including source code) that they are accessing under the terms of a regular SaaS or desktop software agreement. This arrangement does not usually become an issue until technical problems start to arise, i.e., unexpected service interruptions, downtime, loss of application functionality, and loss of data. This can add significant costs to one's business, as they remain reliant upon the software supplier to resolve these issues, unless an escrow agreement is in place. Escrow is when the software source code is held by a third party—an escrow agent—on behalf of the customer and the supplier. Information escrow agents, such as the International Creative Registry, hold in escrow intellectual property and other information. Examples include song music and lyrics, manufacturing designs and laboratory notebooks, and television and movie treatments and scripts. This is done to establish legal ownership rights, with the independent escrow agents attesting to the information's ownership, contents, and creation date.

=== Law ===
Escrow is also known in the judicial context. So-called escrow funds are commonly used to distribute money from a cash settlement in a class action or environmental enforcement action. This way, the defendant is not responsible for the distribution of judgment monies to the individual plaintiffs or the court-determined use (such as environmental remediation or mitigation). The defendant pays the total amount of the judgment (or settlement) to the court-administered or appointed escrow fund, and the fund distributes the money (often reimbursing its expenses from the judgment funds).

=== Real estate ===
In the US, escrow payment is a common term referring to the portion of a mortgage payment that is designated to pay for real property taxes and hazard insurance. It is an amount "over and above" the principal and interest portion of a mortgage payment. Since the escrow payment is used to pay taxes and insurance, it is referred to as "T&I", while the mortgage payment consisting of principal and interest is called "P&I". The total of all elements is then referred to as "PITI", for "Principal, Interest, Tax, and Insurance". Some mortgage companies require customers to maintain an escrow account that pays the property taxes and hazard insurance. Others offer it as an option for customers. Some types of loans, most notably Federal Housing Administration (FHA) loans, require the lender to maintain an escrow account for the life of the loan.

Even with a fixed interest rate, monthly mortgage payments may change over the life of the loan due to changes in property taxes and insurance premiums. For instance, if a hazard insurance premium increases by $120 per year, the escrow payment will need to increase by $10 per month to account for this difference (in addition to collection for the resulting escrow shortage when the mortgage company paid $120 more for the hazard insurance premium than what was anticipated). By RESPA guidelines, the escrow payment must be recomputed at least once every 12 months to account for increases in property taxes or insurance. This is called an escrow analysis.

The escrow payment used to pay taxes and insurance is a long-term escrow account that may last for years or for the life of the loan. Escrow can also refer to a shorter-term account used to facilitate the closing of a real estate transaction. In this type of escrow, the escrow company holds all documents and money related to closing the transaction, rather than having the buyer and the seller deal directly with each other. When and if the transaction is ready to close, the escrow company distributes all funds and documents to their rightful recipients, and records the deed with the appropriate authorities.

Courts sometimes act as stakeholders, holding property while litigation between the possible owners resolves the issue of who is entitled to the property.

=== Mergers and acquisitions ===
Escrow arrangement is often used as a part of mergers and acquisitions, a supplement that warranties and indemnities offered by the seller(s). This will be particularly likely where the credit risk of the seller(s) is of poor quality. The buyer is concerned about their ability to recover any sums that may become due.

Unlike many other forms of escrow, escrow arrangements in corporate transactions are often designed to last for extended periods rather than to complete the transfer of an asset. There is also commonly the requirement for an escrow agent to adjudicate on the validity of a claim on the escrow funds, which can lead to the risk of a dispute between the parties.

Due to the length that the funds are held, the escrow arrangements need to take into account different considerations to those for other escrow arrangements, for example (i) information provision to the parties; (ii) application of interest earned on the funds; and (iii) credit worthiness of the financial institution.

=== Gambling ===
For example, two people may bet on the outcome of a future event. They ask a third, disinterested, neutral person—the stakeholder—to hold the money ("stakes") they have wagered ("staked"). After the event occurs, the stakeholder distributes the stakes to one or both of the original (or other) parties according to the outcome of the event and according to the previously decided conditions. Trustees also often act as stakeholders, holding property until beneficiaries come of age, for example.

== Legal implications ==
Not all escrow agreements impose the duties of a legal trustee on the escrow agent, and in many such contracts, escrow agents are held to a mere gross negligence standard and benefit from indemnity and hold harmless provisions.

If the escrow agent is licensed by a governmental authority, then much higher legal standards may apply.

== See also ==
- Closing (real estate)
- Commingling
- Conveyancer
- Custodian bank
- Delivery versus payment
- Double escrow
- Glossary of poker terms § staking
- Power of attorney
- Ringfencing
- Stewardship
- Stakeholder analysis
- Stakeholder theory
- Stakeholder pension scheme
