= Bogus escrow =

Form of scam

The bogus escrow scam is a straightforward confidence trick in which a scammer operates a bogus escrow service.

Escrow services are intended to ensure security by acting as a middleman in transactions where the two parties do not trust each other. Rather than sending money or goods directly to the other party (which is insecure, as one or the other party must send its item first, at the risk that the other party may not reciprocate), both parties send their items to the escrow service, which holds them until both items are received, then sends each on to the intended recipient. If either party fails to deliver its part of the deal, the other party's item will be held at the escrow service and eventually returned.

In the bogus escrow scam, a scammer sets itself up as the recipient of money or goods and then requests the use of an escrow service which is self-operated. This bogus escrow service assures the victim that the scammer has sent its item and that the victim should send its item to the escrow service. This amounts to sending the item to the scammer, who then immediately closes down the escrow service and does not send its item to the victim. The scammer blames the escrow service, claiming that the item was with it at the time it closed down; if the victim did not investigate the escrow service before using it, the ruse may be believed.

The bogus escrow scam is popular on eBay, where escrow services are often used for high-value transactions. The rise of internet escrow has led to a dramatic increase in bogus internet escrow companies. However, several legitimate and licensed escrow companies do exist.
