= Social Catfish =

Californian online investigation service

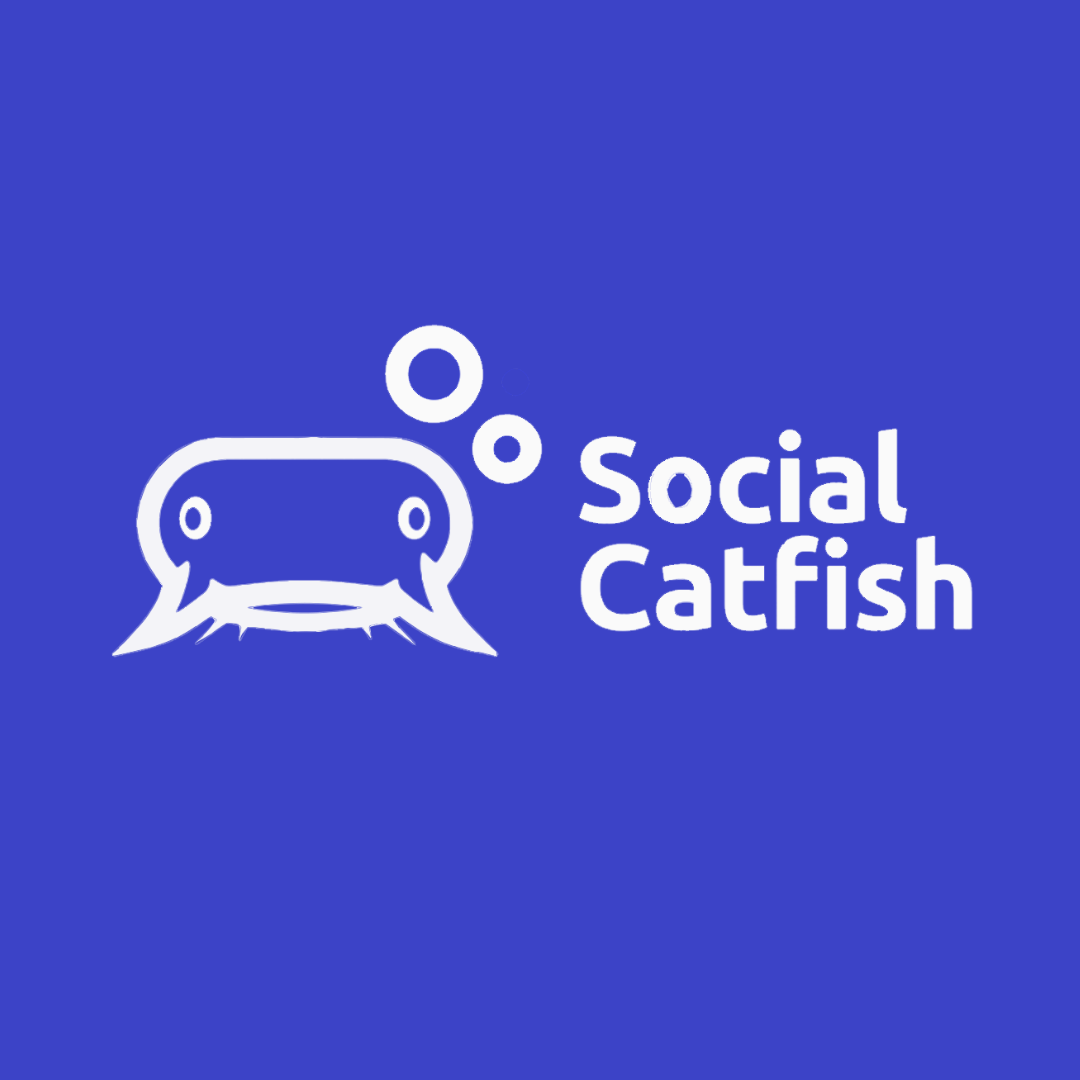
- Type: Private
- Founder: David McClellan
- Headquarters: Murrieta, California
- Services: Background Search, Reverse Image Search, Social Search, and Criminal Records
- Website: https://socialcatfish.com/

Social Catfish is an online investigation service based in Murrieta, California. The company aims to help users avoid internet fraud like romance scams by providing online identity verification. Their website and app allow users to run background checks, including social searches (names, emails, usernames, and phone numbers) and reverse image searches. The service specializes in determining if a person has been caught on other websites catfishing people. Its user interface is similar to other sites that promise personal information will be revealed, only disclosing the cost and payment information after a lengthy, staged series of screens, during which it purportedly searches the entire internet for the requested information.

== History ==
The company initially started as a blog to educate people about online scams and catfishing. Today, Social Catfish is a multifaceted investigation tool with the option to run criminal background checks.

Social Catfish lists names of jurisdictions (Incorporated cities, Census-designated places) instead of major US city neighborhoods.

Social Catfish has been recognized in the media by publications such as Reuters and USA Today, for its ability to detect catfish.

They were nominated for the Inc. 5000 awards and named the 118th fastest-growing company in America. The founder of Social Catfish, David McClellan, was a semi-finalist for the Spirit Awards in both 2019 and 2021 for best service-based entrepreneur within the Inland Empire.

The Better Business Bureau (BBB) Board of Directors revoked Social Catfish's accreditation on November 6, 2025, for failing to follow the BBB's requirement that accredited businesses meet and abide by certain criteria.

== Technology ==
One of the services that Social Catfish provides is a reverse image search engine. The data delivered after conducting a search is aggregated based on public data and profiles from various platforms including social media profiles. Their website is controlled and operated from their offices and facilities within the United States.

Social Catfish also employs a members-only group on Facebook. Within the page, people can post and inform others of scammer profiles they may have encountered online or scenarios they have experienced with scammers to make others aware of potential harm.

They also have an alliance with the Responsible Data Alliance which enhances the privacy settings within the web-page to protect users. The Responsible Data Alliance is a "passion project" of Social Catfish.

Privacy opt-out requests can be submitted online or at 39635 Tinderbox Way, Murrieta CA
