= Jim Browning (YouTuber) =

Northern Irish YouTube personality and scam baiter

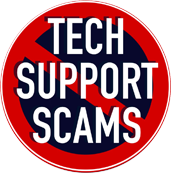
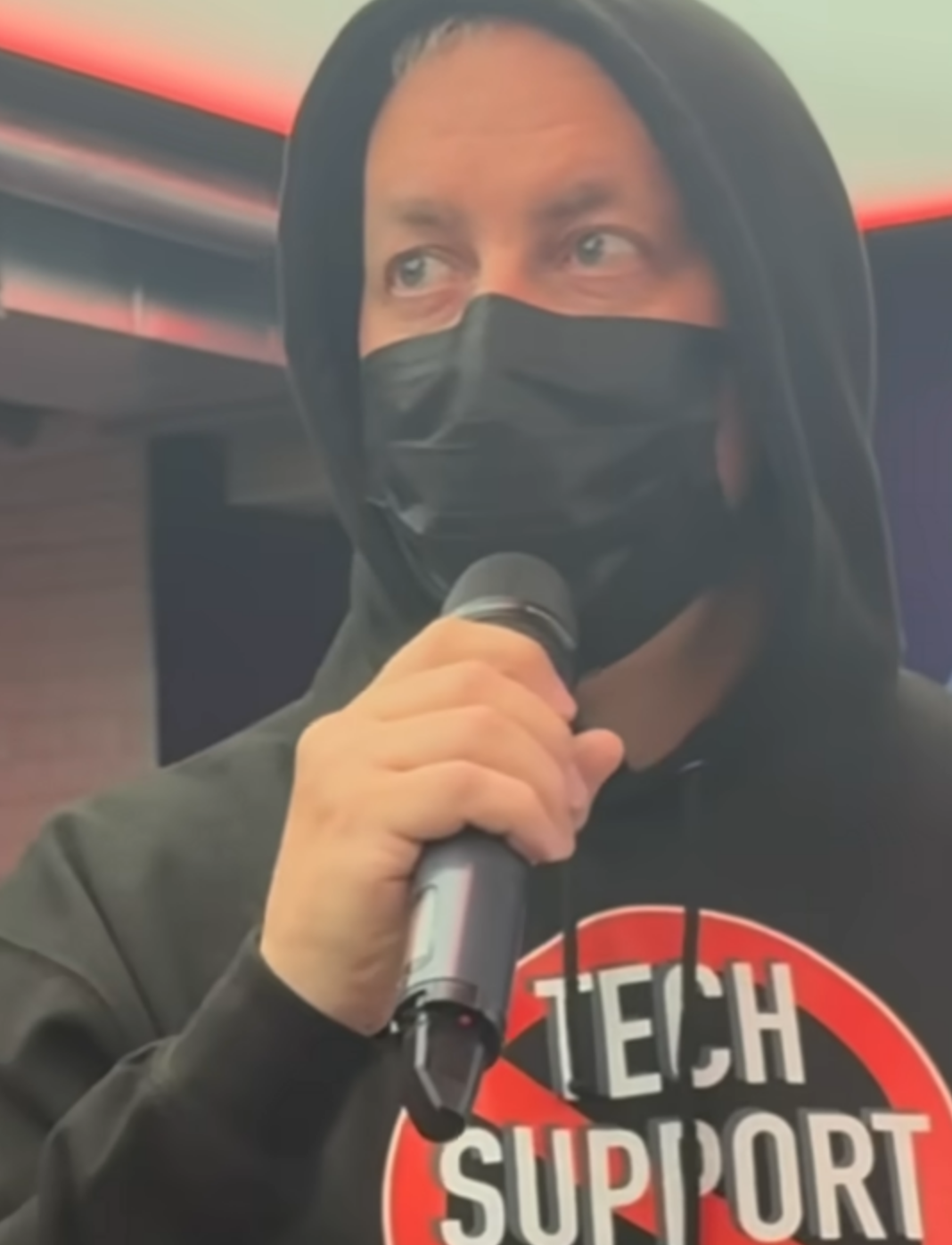
- Browning at the People's Call Center in 2025
- Occupations: Scam baiter; Software engineer

YouTube information
- Channel: Jim Browning
- Years active: 2014–present
- Genre: Scam baiting
- Subscribers: 4.43 million
- Views: 337.24 million
- Last updated: 5 September 2026

Jim Browning is the Internet alias of a software engineer and YouTuber from Northern Ireland whose content focuses on scam baiting and investigating call centres engaging in fraudulent activities. Browning cooperates with other YouTubers and law enforcement when they seek his expertise in investigating and infiltrating scam call centres. Browning has published several journalistic exposé videos highlighting the results of his investigations.

== Scambaiting ==
Browning has been described as the "godfather" of scambusting. Through his technique of "reverse engineering" scams—gaining access to scammers' computers when they attempt to connect to his—he has infiltrated over 3,000 scam call centres and made thousands of "saves" by intercepting active scam calls and warning victims in real time.

A software engineer, Browning began researching scam operations after his relative lost money to a technical support scam. He started his YouTube channel to upload footage to send to authorities as evidence against scammers.

He has since carried out investigations into various scams, where he infiltrates computer networks run by scammers who claim to be technical support experts or pose as US IRS agents and use remote desktop software or social engineering. Such scams have involved unsolicited calls offering computer services, or websites posing to be reputable companies such as Dell or Microsoft.

Browning was featured in a March 2020 episode of British documentary series Panorama, in which a large-scale technical support scamming operation was infiltrated and extensively documented by Browning and fellow YouTuber Karl Rock. The duo recorded drone and CCTV footage of the facility in Gurugram, Haryana, India and gathered incriminating evidence linking alleged scammer Amit Chauhan, who also operated a fraudulent travel agency called "Faremart Travels", to a series of scams targeting computer-illiterate and elderly people in the United Kingdom and United States. During a private meeting with his associates, Chauhan was quoted as stating, "We don't give a shit about our customers". Some of his call centre agents were recorded scamming and laughing at a British man who admitted to being depressed. They were also recorded conning a blind woman with diabetes. Chauhan denied the allegations in a phone interview with the BBC, and he was arrested along with his accountant Sumit Kumar in a raid by Delhi Police. On 2 May 2022, Chauhan was acquitted of all charges at a court hearing in Gurugram and released.

In March 2021, Browning and fellow YouTuber Mark Rober collaborated to construct and distribute automated glitter bombs to identify and report money mules who were receiving their money via shipping services, such as FedEx, before sending it to scammers.

Browning was covered in a 2021 New York Times article documenting his confrontation with a small-scale refund scam operation based in Kolkata, India. The journalist, Yudhijit Bhattacharjee, a native of Kolkata who moved to the United States, described a December 2019 scam-baiting operation by Browning, during which Browning intercepted a refund scam involving an elderly woman. Suspicious, the woman told the scammer that she would cease contact with him, only for the scammer to lock her computer. Browning was able to contact the woman and help her unlock the computer. Bhattacharjee later flew to India to check out call centres that Browning had identified as possible scammers and to confront the individual who had perpetrated the refund scam on the elderly woman.

The April 2021 issue of AARP Bulletin contains an 11-page article by the director of AARP's Washington state office, centring on Browning's work fighting cyber scams.

=== Dubai pig butchering investigation ===
In March 2024, Browning collaborated with an insider whistleblower to expose a large-scale pig butchering scam operation in Dubai, documenting the facility through undercover footage. The operation, run under the business identity "YOMIGT", employed migrant workers from Africa and Southeast Asia who were allegedly controlled by operators who confiscated their passports. Approximately six weeks after Browning released his findings, Dubai Police conducted a raid, arresting over 2,000 individuals in what has been described as one of the largest scam busts in any single location in history.

=== Temporary channel deletion ===
On 26 July 2021, Browning was targeted by scammers who pretended to be YouTube support staff and misled him into deleting his own channel. His channel was reinstated four days later.

He explained in a video that the scammer used Google Chat to send an authenticated phishing email from the "google.com" domain and convinced Browning to delete his channel under the pretence of moving it to a new YouTube brand account.

=== Scam Interceptors ===
In 2022, BBC commissioned a television series for BBC One, Scam Interceptors, presented by Rav Wilding. In the series, Browning and a team of white hat hackers attempt to intercept criminals and prevent fraudulent activity. The first series premiered on 4 April 2022, and the second on 1 May 2023.

== Awards and nominations ==
Year	Award	Category	Result	Ref.
2022	12th Streamy Awards	Collaboration (Note: With Mark Rober and Trilogy Media.)	Won	
