= Scam baiting =

Internet vigilantism tactic

Scam baiting (or scambaiting) is a form of internet vigilantism primarily used towards advance-fee fraud, IRS impersonation scams, technical support scams, pension scams, and consumer financial fraud.

Scambaiters pose as potential victims to waste the time and resources of scammers, gather information useful to authorities, and publicly expose scammers. They may document scammers' tools and methods; warn potential victims; provide discussion forums; disrupt scammers' devices and systems using remote access trojans and computer viruses; or take down fraudulent webpages. Some scambaiters simply call scammers to annoy or anger them by wasting their time dealing with a scambaiter, therefore reducing the scammer's time to scam potential victims. Some scambaiters are motivated by a sense of civic duty, some simply engage for their own amusement, and some are a combination of both.

== Methodology ==
For scams conducted via written communication, baiters may answer scam emails using throwaway email accounts, pretending to be receptive to scammers' offers.

Popular methods of accomplishing the first objective are to ask scammers to fill out lengthy questionnaires; to bait scammers into taking long trips; to encourage the use of poorly made props or inappropriate English-language idioms that surreptitiously cast doubt upon their scams.

Baiters may deceive scammers with claims as ludicrous as the ones they have used to defraud their victims, or they may entrap them with Trojan horses, such as remote administration tools, that enable baiters to gain sensitive information from or damage scammers' computers. Baiters may publicly humiliate scammers by live streaming their sessions or persuading them to produce humiliating images colloquially known as "trophies". Some of the images that were uploaded to early scam baiting websites have been described as a form of schadenfreude or reinforcing racist stereotypes. However, modern day scam baiting content is primarily centred around education on how the scams work and how to prevent falling victim to scams.

== Examples ==
In May 2004, a Something Awful forum poster asked for advice on how to deal with a bogus escrow scam from a buyer on eBay. Since the eBay auction was for an Apple PowerBook G4, the poster sent a three-ring binder crudely dressed as a PowerBook and declared it to customs at the value of a real product. The buyer, who lived overseas, paid several hundred dollars in import duties to claim the fake laptop. A member of the scambaiting website 419eater.com was able to convince a scammer to send him a wooden replica of a Commodore 64.

In 2005, a member of 419eater.com posed as an aid worker at a refugee camp on the Chad/Sudan border in order to bait a trio of Nigerian 419 scammers. He convinced the scammers to travel to the camp to receive $145,000 in person, which would require them to travel through a war zone as well as a region experiencing an active genocide. Two of the men attempted the journey before disappearing, presumably having been jailed or killed by militants, and their boss (the uncle of one of the men sent) realized they had been baited only after selling his car to travel to Khartoum after the baiter convinced him that the men were being held in custody there. This sparked a debate on the website regarding the ethics of baiting scammers into dangerous situations.

In February 2011, the Belgian television show Basta portrayed, with hidden cameras, how a scammer was fooled during a meeting with baiters, raising the stakes by involving a one-armed man, two dwarves and a pony. Eventually, a police raid was faked, during which the baiters were "arrested" and the scammer went free, abandoning the money, and without any suspicion.

In January 2014, members of 419eater.com appeared in two segments of the Channel 4 show Secrets of the Scammers. In the first segment scambaiters persuaded a scammer to travel from London to a remote location in Cornwall by train and taxi to meet a victim (played by a baiter) and collect payment for a gold deal. In the second segment a female scammer met with two scambaiters posing as victims in Trafalgar Square to pass them a fake check. This scammer was subsequently questioned by the police.

In 2015 and 2016, James Veitch hosted three TED talks about scambaiting. Veitch also presented the Mashable video series "Scamalot" on YouTube.

In March 2020, an anonymous YouTuber and grey hat hacker under the alias "Jim Browning" infiltrated and gathered drone and CCTV footage of a fraudulent call centre scam operation in India with the help of fellow YouTube personality Karl Rock. Through the aid of the British documentary programme Panorama, a police raid was carried out when the documentary was brought to the attention of assistant police commissioner Karan Goel.

YouTube and Twitch are popular platforms scambaiters use to educate and entertain their audience about various types of scams.

Many memes have spawned as a result of scam baiting, one of the most popular being the "Do not redeem" meme from Kitboga, in which a scammer helplessly watches Kitboga (in the role of an elderly woman) redeem gift cards while frantically screaming not to redeem the gift cards.

== See also ==
- Internet vigilantism
- Lenny (bot)
- Prank call
- Sting operation
- Vigilantism in the United States of America
