= IRS impersonation scam =

Tax scam

A typical IRS impersonation scam robocall

An IRS impersonation scam is a class of telecommunications fraud and scam which targets American taxpayers by masquerading as Internal Revenue Service (IRS) collection officers. The scammers operate by placing disturbing official-sounding calls to unsuspecting citizens, threatening them with arrest and frozen assets if thousands of dollars are not paid immediately, usually via gift cards or money orders. According to the IRS, over 1,029,601 Americans have received threatening calls, and $29,100,604 has been reported lost to these call scams as of March 2016. The problem has been assigned to the Treasury Inspector General for Tax Administration. Studies highlight that most victims of these scams are aged 20-29 years old and women are more affected than men. One way to decrease the risk of an individual falling victim to IRS impersonation scams is through awareness programs.

The scammers often request payment in the form of gift cards such as Google Play or iTunes cards, wire transfer, MoneyGram, or credit card.

As of September 2017, several people from India have been arrested for impersonating IRS employees.

== The United Kingdom ==
Variations on this scam have targeted British taxpayers, pretending to be from HM Revenue and Customs (HMRC). Sometimes the scammers use telephone calls, sometimes SMS text messages, and sometimes emails. Versions include:

- The scammers threaten a lawsuit by HMRC to recover money allegedly owed.
- The scammers tell people that they are due a tax rebate, and use this to trick them into disclosing their account and personal details.

== Canada ==
Another variation similarly targets Canadians by impersonating the Canada Revenue Agency and utilizing aggressive fear tactics, with at least 60,000 Canadian residents filing complaints from 2013 to 2018.

== Malaysia ==
Variations of this scam are common in Malaysia, where they are known as 'Macau scams'. In addition to posing as tax agents, these scams can involve fraudsters posing as police officers or bank workers.

== Response by companies ==
In response to a modus operandi by scammers where they coax victims into buying prepaid cards or gift cards for online services, companies such as Apple, along with the Federal Trade Commission, have posted advisories warning customers over the illicit use of gift cards by scammers, and not to give out the code to anyone they do not know. Retailers and supermarkets have also followed suit by putting up similar warnings on prepaid and gift card sections. Amazon has also warned of the dangers of these scams by advising customers not to use Amazon.com Gift Cards for payment outside of Amazon or its affiliated properties and not to use gift cards for other retailers and brands outside of the intended brand. Google Play has also published a similar warning on their website.

== See also ==
- FBI
- IRS
- IRS Criminal Investigation Division
- Confidence trick
- Technical support scam
- Scambaiting
- SSA impersonation scam
