= Detekt =

Computer forensics

- Developer(s): Claudio Guarnieri
- Initial release: November 2014
- Final release: 2.0 / July 28, 2015; 9 years ago
- Repository: github.com/botherder/detekt/
- Written in: Python
- Operating system: Windows
- Available in: Amharic, Arabic, English, German, Italian, Spanish
- License: GPLv3
- Website: resistsurveillance.org

Detekt is a discontinued free tool by Amnesty International, Digitale Gesellschaft, EFF, and Privacy International to scan for surveillance software on Microsoft Windows.

It was intended for use by activists and journalists to scan for known spyware.

== The tool ==
Detekt was available for free download.

The tool did not guarantee detection of all spyware, nor was it meant to give a false sense of security, and was meant to be used with other methods to combat malware and spyware.

In 2014, the Coalition Against Unlawful Surveillance Exports estimated that the global trade in surveillance technologies was worth more than 3 billion GBP annually.

Detekt was available in Amharic, Arabic, English, German, Italian, and Spanish.

== Technical ==
The tool required no installation, and was designed to scan for surveillance software on Windows PCs, from XP to Windows 8.1.

The tool scanned for current surveillance software, and after scanning, it would display a summary indicating if any spyware was found or not. It would generate a log file containing the details.

The tool did not guarantee absolute protection from surveillance software, as it scanned for known spyware (at the time of release), which could be modified to circumvent detection, or as new software would become available. Therefore, a clean bill of health didn't necessarily mean that the PC was free of surveillance software.

The website instructed the user to disconnect the internet connection, and close all applications, before running, and not to turn the connection back on if any spyware was found.

Detekt was released under the GPLv3 free license.

Detekt was developed by Claudio Guarnieri with the help of Bill Marczak, Morgan Marquis-Boire, Eva Galperin, Tanya O'Carroll, Andre Meister, Jillian York, Michael Ligh, Endalkachew Chala.

It was provided with patterns for the following malware: DarkComet RAT, XtremeRAT, BlackShades RAT, njRAT, FinFisher FinSpy, HackingTeam RCS, ShadowTech RAT, Gh0st RAT.

== See also ==
- Computer and network surveillance
- Computer surveillance in the workplace
- Internet censorship
- Internet privacy
- Freedom of information
- Tor (anonymity network)
- 2013 mass surveillance disclosures
