= Bundestrojaner =

Bundestrojaner (German for state-sponsored trojan horse, lit. Federal Trojan) may refer to one of several pieces of software with this purpose:

- The Swiss MiniPanzer and MegaPanzer (2006–2009)
- The German Bundestrojaner discovered by Chaos Computer Club in 2011
