= Trojan horse (computing) =

Type of malware

In computing, a trojan horse or trojan is a kind of malware that misleads users as to its true intent by disguising itself as a normal program. Trojans are generally spread by some form of social engineering. Although their payload can be anything, many modern forms act as a backdoor, contacting a controller who can then have unauthorized access to the affected device. Ransomware attacks are often carried out using a trojan. Unlike computer viruses and worms, trojans generally do not attempt to inject themselves into other files or otherwise propagate themselves. Trojan horses are named after the Trojan Horse of Greek mythology.

== Origins of the term ==
The term is derived from the ancient Greek story of the deceptive Trojan Horse that led to the fall of the city of Troy. It is unclear where and when the computing concept, and this term for it, originated; but by 1971 the first Unix manual assumed its readers knew both. Another early reference is in a US Air Force report in 1974 on the analysis of vulnerability in the Multics computer systems.

The term "trojan horse" was popularized by Ken Thompson in his 1983 Turing Award acceptance lecture "Reflections on Trusting Trust", subtitled: "To what extent should one trust a statement that a program is free of Trojan horses? Perhaps it is more important to trust the people who wrote the software." He mentioned that he knew about the possible existence of trojans from a report on the security of Multics.

=== Capitalization ===
The computer term "trojan horse" is derived from the legendary Trojan Horse of the ancient city of Troy. For this reason, "Trojan" is often capitalized, especially in older sources; however, many modern style guides and dictionaries suggest a lower-case "trojan" for this technical use.

== Behavior ==
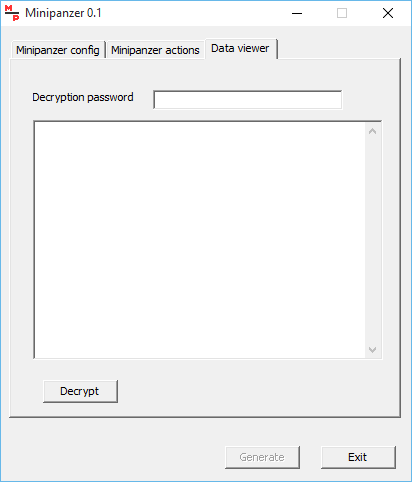
Screenshot of MiniPanzer

Once installed, trojans may perform a range of malicious actions. Many tend to contact one or more Command and Control (C2) servers across the Internet and await instruction. Since individual trojans typically use a specific set of ports for this communication, it can be relatively simple to detect them. Moreover, other malware could potentially "take over" the trojan, using it as a proxy for malicious action.

In German-speaking countries, spyware used or made by the government is sometimes called govware. Govware is typically used to intercept communications from the target device. Some countries like Switzerland and Germany have a legal framework governing the use of such software. Examples of govware trojans include the Swiss MiniPanzer and MegaPanzer and the German "state trojan" nicknamed R2D2. German govware works by exploiting security gaps unknown to the general public and accessing smartphone data before it becomes encrypted via other applications.

Due to the popularity of botnets among hackers and the availability of advertising services that permit authors to violate their users' privacy, trojans are becoming more common. According to a survey conducted by BitDefender from January to June 2009, "Trojan-type malware is on the rise, accounting for 83% of the global malware detected in the world." BitDefender has stated that approximately 15% of computers are members of a botnet, usually recruited by a trojan infection.

Recent investigations have revealed that the trojan-horse method has been used as an attack on cloud computing systems. A trojan attack on cloud systems tries to insert an application or service into the system that can impact the cloud services by changing or stopping the functionalities. When the cloud system identifies the attacks as legitimate, the service or application is performed which can damage and infect the cloud system.

== Classifications of trojan horses ==
Trojans are usually classified based on their primary function or intended impact. One major category is the banking trojan, which is designed to steal financial information such as online banking credentials, credit card numbers, or cryptocurrency wallet keys. Zeus and TrickBot are among the most studied examples of this type. Another category is the remote access trojan, (RAT), which allows attackers to gain full remote control over an infected system, enabling them to install additional software, access files, or monitor user activity.

Some trojans are primarily downloaders, meaning they serve as an initial infection stage by installing other forms of malware once inside a system. These often pave the way for ransomware, spyware, or botnet recruitment. Information-stealing trojans are also common, collecting sensitive data such as browser cookies, stored credentials, or documents without the user’s knowledge. Furthermore, fake antivirus trojans imitate legitimate security software, tricking users into paying for unnecessary or harmful services. Because trojans can be adapted for multiple purposes, many modern types have overlapping features, mixing elements of backdoors, spyware, and downloaders. This adaptability has been a major factor in their prevalence as one of the most common forms of malware.

== Linux ls example ==
A trojan horse is a program that purports to perform some legitimate function, yet upon execution it compromises the user's security. One simple example is the following malicious version of the Linux ls command. An attacker would place this executable script in a publicly writable and "high-traffic" location (e.g., /tmp/ls). Then, any victim who tried to run ls from that directory — if and only if the victim's executable search PATH unwisely included the current directory . — would execute /tmp/ls instead of /usr/bin/ls, and have their home directory deleted.

#!/usr/bin/env bash
rm -rf ~ 2>/dev/null # Remove the user's home directory, then remove self.
rm $0

Similar scripts could hijack other common commands; for example, a script purporting to be the sudo command (which prompts for the user's password) could instead mail that password to the attacker. In these examples, the malicious program imitates the name of a well-known useful program, rather than pretending to be a novel and unfamiliar (but harmless) program. As such, these examples also resemble typosquatting and supply chain attacks.

== Prevention and mitigation ==
Preventing trojan infections requires a mix of user awareness, technical safeguards, and proactive security practices. Educating users about the dangers of downloading unverified files or executing unknown programs remains an effective way to prevent attacks. Security software such as antivirus and anti-malware programs can help detect, quarantine, and remove trojans when kept up to date. Safe browsing practices—such as avoiding suspicious links, refraining from downloading software from untrusted sources, and exercising caution with email attachments—are also key to reducing risk. Additionally, maintaining regular software and operating system updates ensures that known vulnerabilities are patched, making it harder for trojans to exploit weaknesses. In professional environments, network firewalls, intrusion detection systems (IDS), and email filtering tools are commonly used to block suspicious traffic and prevent trojans from communicating with external servers. Regular security checks, employee training programs, and routine data backups further strengthen defenses and help reduce potential damage in the event of an infection.

== Modern developments and detection techniques ==
Modern trojan horses have changed beyond traditional file-based malware, progressively using techniques designed to avoid signature-based security tools. An example of this approach is fileless malware, in which trojans operate mainly in system memory and rely on legitimate administrative tools like PowerShell or Windows Management Instrumentation (WMI). By lowering or removing malicious files on disk, fileless trojans are more difficult for conventional antivirus software to detect. In recent years, trojans have expanded to mobile and embedded platforms. Android trojans are often distributed through unofficial application stores or phishing campaigns and may request more permissions that allow access to messages, stored credentials, or financial information. Trojans targeting Internet of Things (IoT) devices often take advantage of weak authentication practices or unpatched firmware, which in turn allows compromised devices to be incorporated into large botnets used for distributed denial-of-service (DDoS) attacks. To counter these developments, modern security systems increasingly rely on behavior-based detection techniques. Rather than depending only on known malware signatures, behavioral analysis monitors system activity for signs such as unauthorized privilege escalation or suspicious network communication patterns. Alongside behavior-based detection, machine learning–based methods have been developed to classify and detect trojans by identifying irregularities within large-scale system and network telemetry data. While these approaches can help detection rates, they also present challenges related to false positives and the clarity of automated decision-making systems

== Notable examples ==
There have been many well-known trojans that have played an important role in the history of cybersecurity. An early example is the AIDS trojan, developed in 1989. It is considered one of the first forms of ransomware, as it encrypted filenames on infected computers and demanded payment to restore them.

An example is the You Are An Idiot trojan, developed in 2002 and posted at YouAreAnIdiot.org, which functioned as a browser-based trojan. This site overwhelmed users by displaying flashing black-and-white smiley faces while continuously looping a vocal track. A "pop-up bomb", it would spawn six new windows every time a user attempted to close one and disabled standard hotkeys like Alt+F4. While it did not cause permanent damage to files, it frequently exhausted system resources and caused computers to freeze. Safe versions of the website were later created without the spawn feature.

Another example is the Zeus trojan, first identified in 2007. Zeus mainly targeted Microsoft Windows systems and was designed to steal banking credentials through man-in-the-browser attacks, which infect a user's browser to intercept and manipulate data, leading to widespread financial losses and data breaches. In 2015, in Ukraine, an attacker group, by means of an authenticated computer that was controlled remotely using a remote access trojan, gained access to a controller server, that resulted in an electricity outage for 80.000 people. In 2016, the MEMZ trojan, a Windows-based program, became widely recognized for its complex and destructive payloads. MEMZ gained notoriety for displaying unusual visual effects on infected machines and ultimately rendering the systems unusable. Emotet, first identified as a banking trojan in 2014, was disrupted in January 2021 when an international law enforcement operation coordinated by Europol and Eurojust took control of its servers.

In 2022, several remote access trojan horses were identified. A Chinese RAT called "Alchimist" targeted Windows, MacOS and Linux operating systems. It was able to remotely execute certain actions, capture screenshots and run arbitrary commands. Another trojan horse was dubbed "Cloud9" and used a malicious Chrome browser extension to steal online accounts. Qakbot, which emerged as a banking trojan in 2007, was disrupted in 2023 by an international operation led by the US Department of Justice and the FBI. Investigators seized servers used to control the botnet and instructed infected computers to uninstall the malware, removing it from tens of thousands of Windows machines.

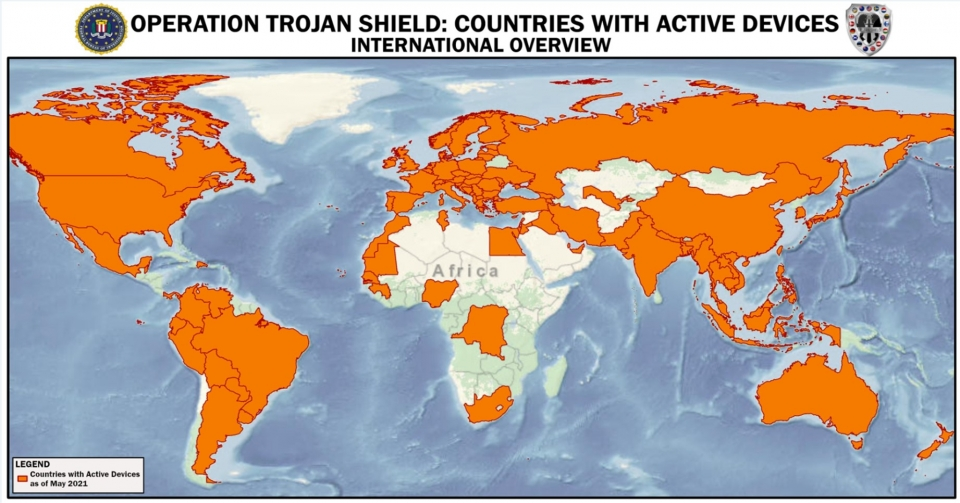
Map of countries touched by ANOM

=== Private and governmental ===
- ANOM – FBI
- 0zapftis / r2d2 StaatsTrojaner – DigiTask
- FinFisher – Lench IT solutions / Gamma International
- DaVinci / Galileo RCS – HackingTeam
- Magic Lantern – FBI
- SUNBURST – SVR/Cozy Bear (suspected)
- TAO QUANTUM/FOXACID – NSA
- WARRIOR PRIDE – GCHQ

=== Publicly available ===
- EGABTR – late 1980s
- Netbus – 1998 (published)
- Sub7 by Mobman – 1999 (published)
- Back Orifice – 1998 (published)
- Y3K by Tselentis brothers – 2000 (published)
- Beast – 2002 (published)
- YouAreAnIdiot by Andrew Regner - 2002 (published)
- Bifrost Trojan – 2004 (published)
- DarkComet – 2008-2012 (published)
- Blackhole exploit kit – 2012 (published)
- Gh0st RAT – 2009 (published)
- MegaPanzer BundesTrojaner – 2009 (published)
- MEMZ by Leurak – 2016 (published)

=== Detected by security researchers ===
- Twelve Tricks – 1990
- Clickbot.A – 2006 (discovered)
- Zeus – 2007 (discovered)
- Flashback Trojan – 2011 (discovered)
- ZeroAccess – 2011 (discovered)
- Koobface – 2008 (discovered)
- Vundo – 2009 (discovered)
- Coreflood – 2010 (discovered)
- Tiny Banker Trojan – 2012 (discovered)
- Wirelurker - 2014 (discovered)
- Shedun (Android malware) – 2015 (discovered)

== See also ==
- Cuckoo's egg (metaphor) – Metaphor for brood parasitism
- Dancing pigs – Users' disregard for IT security
- Principle of least privilege – Security by granting only essential access
- Reverse connection – Network connection type used to bypass firewall restrictions on open ports
- Technical support scam
- Timeline of computer viruses and worms
- Zombie (computer science) – Collection of compromised internet-connected devices controlled by a third party
