= Remote computing =

Remote computing may refer to:

- Remote desktop software
- Cloud computing
