= Boire =

Boire is the French verb to drink. It may also refer to:

- Nashua Airport, also known as Boire Field
- A 1995 album by French singer Miossec
- An alternate name for Detarium senegalense, also called sweet detar or tallow tree
- A Boire is a hydrographic term used to designate an arm of the Loire and Allier rivers.

== People with the surname ==
- Alain Boire (born 1971), a Quebecker politician

== See also ==
- Morgan Marquis-Boire (born 1980), New Zealand-born hacker, journalist, and security researcher
