= EGABTR =

Computer malware

EGABTR (EGA for enhanced graphics adapter), sometimes pronounced "Eggbeater", was a Trojan horse program that achieved some level of notoriety in the late 1980s and early 1990s. Allegedly a graphics utility that would improve the quality of an EGA display, it actually was malware that deleted the file allocation tables on the hard drive. This deletion was accompanied by a text message reading "Arf! Arf! Got you!". First isolated in the United States in 1985, coverage about this virus has translated in languages such as German, Chinese and Indonesian. Various sources disagree as to the exact wording.

In the 1980s, Richard Streeter, a CBS executive, once downloaded the Trojan virus, learned about EGABTR after visiting electronic Bulletin boards, hoping to find something to improve his operating system and unknowingly downloaded the virus.
