= Beast (Trojan horse) =

Windows-based backdoor trojan horse

- Developer: Tataye
- Final release: 2.07 / August 3, 2004
- Operating system: Microsoft Windows
- Type: Remote administration; trojan horse
- License: Freeware

Beast is a Windows-based backdoor trojan horse, more commonly known in the hacking community as a remote administration tool or "RAT". It is capable of infecting versions of Windows from 95 to XP. Written in Delphi and released first by its author Tataye in 2002, it became quite popular due to its unique features. It used the typical client–server model where the client would be under operation by the attacker and the server is what would infect the victim. Beast was one of the first trojans to feature a reverse connection to its victims, and once established it gave the attacker complete control over the infected computer. The virus would be harmless until opened. When opened, the virus would use the code injection method to inject itself into other applications.

On a machine running Windows XP, removal of three files (“explorer.exe” (Windows Explorer), “iexplore.exe” (Internet Explorer), or “msnmsgr.exe” (MSN Messenger)) in safe mode with system restore turned off would disinfect the system.

== See also ==
- ILOVEYOU
