= Tailored Access Operations =

Unit of the U.S. National Security Agency

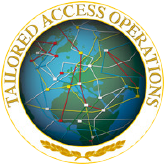
- Abbreviation: TAO
- Formation: c. 1997–2001
- Purpose: Cyberespionage; Cyberwarfare
- Headquarters: Fort Meade
- Region served: United States
- Official language: English
- Parent organization: S3 Data Acquisition

A reference to Tailored Access Operations in an XKeyscore slide

The Office of Tailored Access Operations (TAO), structured as S32, is a cyberwarfare intelligence-gathering unit of the National Security Agency (NSA). It has been active since at least 1998, possibly 1997, but was not named or structured as TAO until "the last days of 2000," according to General Michael Hayden.

TAO identifies, monitors, infiltrates, and gathers intelligence on computer systems being used by entities foreign to the United States.

== History ==
TAO is reportedly "the largest and arguably the most important component of the NSA's huge Signals Intelligence Directorate (SID), consisting of more than 1,000 military and civilian computer hackers, intelligence analysts, targeting specialists, computer hardware and software designers, and electrical engineers." The office was later renamed the Office of Computer Network Operations (CNO). In July 2026 the NSA was reported to have restored the name Tailored Access Operations as part of a reorganization.

A document in the Snowden disclosures states it has software templates allowing it to break into commonly used hardware, including "routers, switches, and firewalls from multiple product vendor lines". TAO engineers prefer to tap networks rather than isolated computers, because there are typically many devices on a single network.

In 2013, their ANT catalog was leaked to Der Spiegel by an unknown source.

== Organization ==
=== Structure ===
TAO's headquarters are termed the Remote Operations Center (ROC) and are based at the NSA headquarters at Fort Meade, Maryland. TAO has expanded to NSA Hawaii (Wahiawa, Oahu), NSA Georgia (Fort Gordon, Georgia), NSA Texas (Joint Base San Antonio, Texas), and NSA Colorado (Buckley Space Force Base, Denver).

- S321 – Remote Operations Center (ROC): six hundred employees gather information from around the world.
- S323 – Data Network Technologies Branch (DNT): develops automated spyware
  - S3231 – Access Division (ACD)
  - S3232 – Cyber Networks Technology Division (CNT)
  - S3233 –
  - S3234 – Computer Technology Division (CTD)
  - S3235 – Network Technology Division (NTD)
- Telecommunications Network Technologies Branch (TNT): improve network and computer-hacking methods
- Mission Infrastructure Technologies Branch: operates the software provided above
- S328 – Access Technologies Operations Branch (ATO): Reportedly includes personnel seconded by the CIA and the FBI, who perform what are described as "off-net operations", which means they arrange for CIA agents to surreptitiously plant eavesdropping devices on computers and telecommunications systems overseas so that TAO's hackers may remotely access them from Fort Meade. Specially equipped submarines, currently the USS Jimmy Carter, are used to wiretap fibre optic cables around the globe.
  - S3283 – Expeditionary Access Operations (EAO)
  - S3285 – Persistence Division

=== Virtual locations ===
Details on a program titled QUANTUMSQUIRREL indicate NSA ability to masquerade as any routable IPv4 or IPv6 host. This enables an NSA computer to generate false geographical location and personal identification credentials when accessing the Internet utilizing QUANTUMSQUIRREL.

=== Leadership ===
From 2013 to 2017, the head of TAO was Rob Joyce, a longtime employee who had previously worked in the NSA's Information Assurance Directorate (IAD). In January 2016, Joyce made a rare public appearance, giving a presentation at the Usenix’s Enigma conference. Joyce later led the NSA's Cybersecurity Directorate from 2021. In February 2024 the agency announced that he would retire at the end of March.

== QUANTUM attacks ==
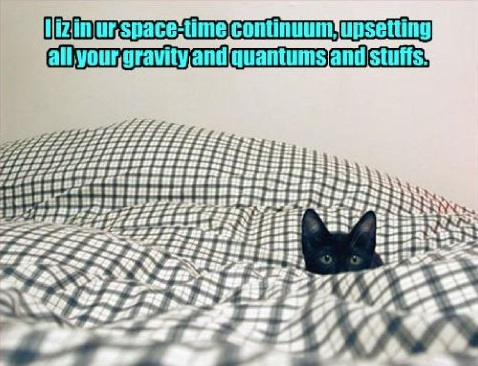
Lolcat image from an NSA presentation explaining in part the naming of the QUANTUM program

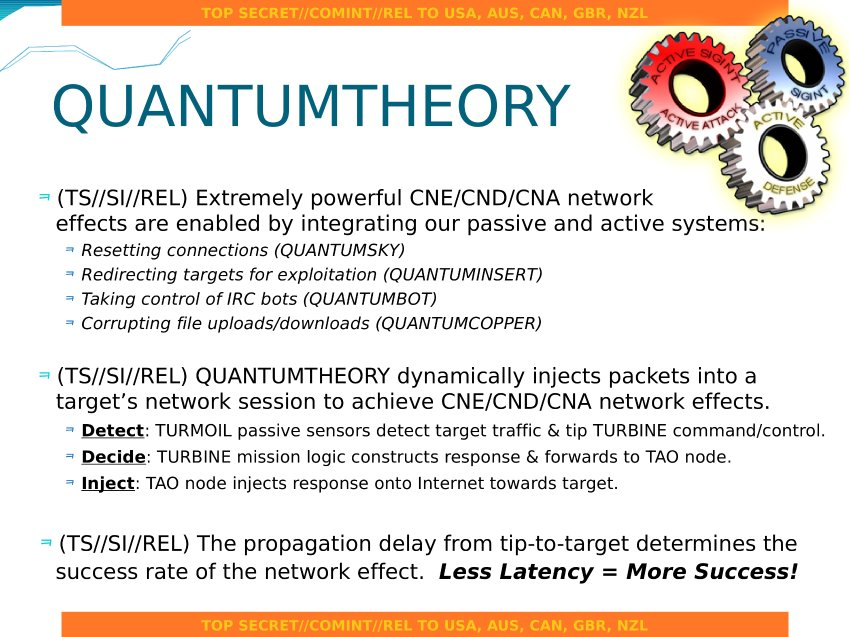
NSA's QUANTUMTHEORY overview slide with various codenames for specific types of attack and integration with other NSA systems

The TAO has developed an attack suite they call QUANTUM. It relies on a compromised router that duplicates internet traffic, typically HTTP requests, so that they go both to the intended target and to an NSA site (indirectly). The NSA site runs FOXACID software, which sends back exploits that load in the background in the target web browser before the intended destination has had a chance to respond, although it is unclear whether the compromised router facilitates this race on the return trip. Prior to the development of this technology, FOXACID software made spear-phishing attacks the NSA referred to as spam. If the browser is exploitable, further permanent "implants" (rootkits, etc.) are deployed in the target computer; e.g., OLYMPUSFIRE for Windows, which gives complete remote access to the infected machine. This type of attack is part of the man-in-the-middle attack family, though more specifically it is called man-on-the-side attack. It is difficult to execute without controlling some of the Internet backbone.

There are numerous services that FOXACID can exploit this way. The names of some FOXACID modules are given below:

- alibabaForumUser
- doubleclickID
- rocketmail
- hi5
- HotmailID
- LinkedIn
- mailruid
- msnMailToken64
- Tencent QQ
- Facebook
- Twitter
- Yahoo
- Gmail
- YouTube

By collaboration with the British Government Communications Headquarters (GCHQ) (MUSCULAR), Google services could be attacked too, including Gmail.

Finding machines that are exploitable and worth attacking is done using analytic databases such as XKeyscore. A specific method of finding vulnerable machines is interception of Windows Error Reporting traffic, which is logged into XKeyscore.

QUANTUM attacks launched from NSA sites can be too slow for some combinations of targets and services as they essentially try to exploit a race condition, i.e. the NSA server is trying to beat the legitimate server with its response. As of mid-2011, the NSA was prototyping a capability codenamed QFIRE, which involved embedding their exploit-dispensing servers in virtual machines (running on VMware ESX) hosted closer to the target, in the so-called Special Collection Sites (SCS) network worldwide. The goal of QFIRE was to lower the latency of the spoofed response, thus increasing the probability of success.

COMMENDEER [sic] is used to commandeer (i.e. compromise) untargeted computer systems. The software is used as a part of QUANTUMNATION, which also includes the software vulnerability scanner VALIDATOR. The tool was first described at the 2014 Chaos Communication Congress by Jacob Appelbaum, who characterized it as tyrannical.

QUANTUMCOOKIE is a more complex form of attack which can be used against Tor users.

== Targets and collaborations ==
Suspected, alleged and confirmed targets of the Tailored Access Operations unit include national and international entities like China, Northwestern Polytechnical University, OPEC, and Mexico's Secretariat of Public Security.

The group has also targeted global communication networks via SEA-ME-WE 4 – an optical fibre submarine communications cable system that carries telecommunications between Singapore, Malaysia, Thailand, Bangladesh, India, Sri Lanka, Pakistan, United Arab Emirates, Saudi Arabia, Sudan, Egypt, Italy, Tunisia, Algeria and France. Additionally, Försvarets radioanstalt (FRA) in Sweden gives access to fiber optic links for QUANTUM cooperation.

TAO's QUANTUM INSERT technology was passed to UK services, particularly to GCHQ's MyNOC, which used it to target Belgacom and GPRS roaming exchange (GRX) providers like the Comfone, Syniverse, and Starhome. Belgacom, which provides services to the European Commission, the European Parliament and the European Council discovered the attack.

In concert with the CIA and FBI, TAO is used to intercept laptops purchased online, divert them to secret warehouses where spyware and hardware is installed, and send them on to customers. Documents leaked by Edward Snowden in 2013 also indicated that the NSA had used a flaw in the version of Firefox bundled with Tor to track Tor users.

According to a 2013 article in Foreign Policy, TAO has become "increasingly accomplished at its mission, thanks in part to the high-level cooperation it secretly receives from the 'big three' American telecom companies (AT&T, Verizon and Sprint), most of the large US-based Internet service providers, and many of the top computer security software manufacturers and consulting companies." A 2012 TAO budget document claims that these companies, on TAO's behest, "insert vulnerabilities into commercial encryption systems, IT systems, networks and endpoint communications devices used by targets". A number of US companies, including Cisco and Dell, have subsequently made public statements denying that they insert such back doors into their products. Microsoft provides advance warning to the NSA of vulnerabilities it knows about, before fixes or information about these vulnerabilities is available to the public; this enables TAO to execute so-called zero-day attacks. A Microsoft official who declined to be identified in the press confirmed that this is indeed the case, but said that Microsoft cannot be held responsible for how the NSA uses this advance information.

== Equation Group ==
The Equation Group is a threat actor that has been linked by security researchers to the TAO. Kaspersky Lab described the group in 2015 as one of the most advanced advanced persistent threats it had investigated, and reported similarities between its activities and those associated with the developers of Stuxnet and Flame. Reported targets of the group have included entities in Iran, Russia, Pakistan, Afghanistan, India, Syria, and Mali.

The name originated from the group's extensive use of encryption. By 2015, Kaspersky documented 500 malware infections by the group in at least 42 countries, while acknowledging that the actual number could be in the tens of thousands due to its self-terminating protocol.

In 2017, WikiLeaks published a discussion held within the CIA on how it had been possible to identify the group. One commenter wrote that "the Equation Group as labeled in the report does not relate to a specific group but rather a collection of tools" used for hacking.

=== Alleged TAO links ===
In 2015 Kaspersky's research findings on the Equation Group noted that its loader, "GrayFish", had similarities to a previously discovered loader, "Gauss",^{[repository]} from another attack series, and separately noted that the Equation Group used two zero-day attacks later used in Stuxnet; the researchers concluded that "the similar type of usage of both exploits together in different computer worms, at around the same time, indicates that the EQUATION group and the Stuxnet developers are either the same or working closely together".

Two former NSA employees stated to Reuters that the Kaspersky analysis was correct.

The NSA codewords "STRAITACID" and "STRAITSHOOTER" have been found inside the malware. In addition, timestamps in the malware seem to indicate that the programmers worked overwhelmingly Monday–Friday in what would correspond to an 08:00–17:00 (8:00 AM - 5:00 PM) workday in an Eastern United States time zone.

F-Secure claims that the Equation Group's malicious hard drive firmware is TAO program "IRATEMONK" from the ANT catalog.

=== 2016 breach of the Equation Group ===
In August 2016, a hacking group calling itself "The Shadow Brokers" announced that it had stolen malware code from the Equation Group. Kaspersky Lab noticed similarities between the stolen code and earlier known code from the Equation Group malware samples it had in its possession including quirks unique to the Equation Group's way of implementing the RC6 encryption algorithm, and therefore concluded that this announcement is legitimate. The most recent dates of the stolen files are from June 2013, thus prompting Edward Snowden to speculate that a likely lockdown resulting from his leak of the NSA's global and domestic surveillance efforts stopped The Shadow Brokers' breach of the Equation Group. Exploits against Cisco Adaptive Security Appliances and Fortinet's firewalls were featured in some malware samples released by The Shadow Brokers. EXTRABACON, a Simple Network Management Protocol exploit against Cisco's ASA software, was a zero-day exploit as of the time of the announcement. Juniper also confirmed that its NetScreen firewalls were affected. The EternalBlue exploit was used to conduct the damaging worldwide WannaCry ransomware attack.

=== 2022 alleged Northwestern Polytechnical University hack ===
In 2022, Chinese authorities accused the NSA's Office of Tailored Access Operations (TAO) of an extensive cyber attack on China's Northwestern Polytechnical University (NPU), based on an investigation conducted by the Chinese National Computer Virus Emergency Response Center (CVERC) and computer security firm Qihoo 360. According to the CVERC, the attackers compromised tens of thousands of network devices in China over the years and exfiltrated over 140GB of high-value data.

The CVERC alleged that the attack involved a "longer period of preparatory work", setting up an anonymized attack infrastructure by leveraging SunOS zero-days to compromise institutions with large network traffic in 17 countries, 70% of which neighbored China. Those compromised machines were used as "springboards" to gain access into the NPU by leveraging man-in-the-middle and spear-phishing attacks against students and teachers. The report also claims the NSA had used two cover companies, "Jackson Smith Consultants" and "Mueller Diversified Systems", to purchase US-based IP addresses that would later be used in the FOXACID platform to launch attacks on the Northwestern.

CVERC and 360 identified 41 different tools and malware samples during forensic analysis, many of which were similar or consistent with TAO weapons exposed in the Shadow Brokers leak. Investigators also attributed the attack to the Equation Group due to a mixture of attack times, human errors and American English keyboard inputs. Forensic analysis on one of the tools, called "NOPEN", which required human input, indicated that 98% of all attacks occurred during U.S. working hours, with no cyber-attacks being logged during weekends or during American holidays such as Memorial Day and Independence Day.

== See also ==
- Advanced persistent threat
- Cyberwarfare in the United States
- Firmware hacking
- Global surveillance disclosures (2013–present)
- Magic Lantern (software)
- MiniPanzer and MegaPanzer
- PLA Unit 61398
- Stuxnet
- Syrian Electronic Army
- Unit 8200
- United States intelligence operations abroad
- WARRIOR PRIDE
