= Blackshades =

Computer malware

Malware details
- Type: Trojan horse
- Subtype: Remote administration trojan
- Isolation date: c. 2010
- Authors: Alex Yucel and Michael Hogue

Technical details
- Platform: Windows

Blackshades is a malicious trojan horse used by hackers to control infected computers remotely. The malware targets computers using operating systems based on Microsoft Windows. According to US officials, over 500,000 computer systems have been infected worldwide with the software.

In 2014, the United States Federal Bureau of Investigation (FBI) arrested hundreds of people who had Blackshades in their computer. Before the FBI crackdown, Blackshades was sold for US$40 on Hack Forums, and reportedly generated US$350,000 in sales.

== Functionality ==
Blackshades infects computer systems by downloading onto a victim's computer when the victim accesses a malicious webpage (sometimes downloading onto the victim's computer without the victim's knowledge, known as a drive-by download) or through external storage devices, such as USB flash drives. Blackshades has the ability to infect and hack multiple computers from the release of a bait that the hacker can make use of, an improved version of Blackshades was released shortly after the original release of the primary version, when hacking organizations like BoramLab and Cyber-Sec, decided to develop special features for coupling to the software such as undetectability, DDoS / TCP Flood, and backdoor persistence features.

Blackshades can reportedly be used remotely to access an infected computer without authorization. Blackshades allows hackers to perform many actions on an infected computer remotely without authorization, including the ability to:

- Access and modify files on the victim's computer.
- Log keystrokes on the victim's computer.
- Access to the webcam of the victim.
- Make all infected computers subordinate to DDoS attack commands, using them as robots to carry out extremely effective attacks against targets.
- Download and execute files on the victim's computer.
- Use the victim's computer as a proxy server.

Blackshades reportedly can be used by computer hackers with little experience or by script kiddies, hackers that use programs developed by others to attack computer systems.

Blackshades can also act as ransomware. Hackers using Blackshades can restrict access to the victim's computer and demand a ransom paid to the hacker in order for the restriction to be lifted.

== Detection and removal ==
Many antivirus programs can successfully detect and remove Blackshades, however hackers using the Blackshades software usually avoid detection of Blackshades infections by using software that obfuscates the Blackshades binary to avoid detection by antivirus programs, which the Blackshades organization also sold along with the Blackshades software.

== Blackshades in the media ==
In 2012, Citizen Lab and EFF reported on the use of Blackshades to target opposition forces in Syria.

In 2015, Stefan Rigo from Leeds was given a 40-week suspended sentence for using BlackShades against 14 people, 7 of whom he knew personally. It is reported he paid for the software using his ex-girlfriend's payment card.

In 2013, Cassidy Wolf was a victim of sextortion, after photographs of her were hacked and used in an attempt to blackmail her after being Miss Teen USA 2013. The FBI ran a probe after Wolf reported a threatening email demanding a 'special performance' for the hacker, whom she suspected to be Jared James Abrahams, her former high school classmate. Wolf never created the video demanded, and on September 26, 2013, Abrahams surrendered to FBI agents in Orange County. In November 2013, Abrahams pleaded guilty to hacking over 100-150 women and installing Blackshades on their computers in order to obtain nude images and videos of them. One of his victims was a 14-year-old girl. On March 18, 2014; Abrahams was sentenced to 18 months in federal prison. Legal scholar Star Kashman speculates that Abrahams used the technique of Google Dorking to find and target Cassidy Wolf's webcam online, leading to the act of sextortion.

== FBI crackdown ==
In 2012, the FBI ran a sting operation called "Operation Card Shop", which led to 24 arrests of hackers in eight countries. One of those arrested was Michael Hogue (also known as xVisceral in online hacking communities). Hogue, a co-creator of Blackshades, was arrested and indicted on charges under 18 U.S.C. § 1030, more commonly known as the Computer Fraud and Abuse Act. He was sentenced to five years of probation, 20 years suspended prison sentence.

In 2014, the FBI coordinated a worldwide operation to combat the use of the malware, leading to the arrest of almost one hundred people in nineteen countries. On May 19, charges were laid in the United States against five individuals: two men identified as developers of Blackshades and three other men who sold the software or used it to infiltrate other people's computers. Exactly 359 searches were conducted and more than 1,100 electronic devices have been seized as part of the operation. According to the FBI, over 500,000 computers in more than 100 countries were infected by the malware. Blackshades sold typically for US$40, and reportedly generated US$350,000 in sales.
