= Commentary article =

Type of academic article

A commentary article is a short narrowly focused article that is usually commissioned by an Academic journal, though they are sometimes published from unsolicited submissions.
