= WARRIOR PRIDE =

Computer spyware

WARRIOR PRIDE is the GCHQ and NSA code name for a pair of spyware kits that can be installed on the iPhone and Android-based smartphones. Information about these kits was published by the press on 27 January 2014 from the documents leaked by Edward Snowden.

== Kits ==
The iPhone kit was developed first; its code was ported from an undisclosed code base. The Android port was completed later (Q3 2010) and it was done in collaboration with Communications Security Establishment Canada. Although using different code, the modules of the kit have the same names on both platforms (all seemingly derived from The Smurfs cartoons), and correspond to their functionality as follows:

- DREAMY SMURF – handles power management, which according to The Guardian includes "an ability to stealthily activate a phone that is apparently turned off"
- NOSEY SMURF – "hot mic", turning on the microphone to listen in on conversations
- TRACKER SMURF – high-precision geolocation
- PORUS – "kernel stealth"
- PARANOID SMURF – "self-protection"

As file retrieval capabilities, the iPhone kit claims to get "any content from the phone, e.g. SMS, MMS, e-mails, web history, call records, videos, photos, address book, notes, calendar (if its [sic] on the phone we can get it)." The Android slide differs slightly in that the last sentence is a qualified "we think we can get it".

This type of software was apparently used, among other things, to discredit Muslim targets by exposing their "online promiscuity" (usage of pornography).

The cost for the whole NSA program targeting smartphones was cited at one billion dollars. The program includes additional interception capabilities that can be performed just by intercepting network traffic, including collecting information leaked by many apps, metadata (Exif) collection from smartphone photo uploads to social media sites, interception of Google Maps requests to geolocate the user etc.

== See also ==
- NSA ANT catalog – an NSA document revealing a broader but older (2008) set of tools, not only for smartphones
- Regin (malware) – sophisticated malware toolkit
- Tailored Access Operations
