= DarkComet =

RAT software

- Developer: Jean-Pierre Lesueur (DarkCoderSc)
- Final release: 5.3.1
- Operating system: Microsoft Windows
- Type: Remote Administration Tool
- License: freeware
- Website: https://www.darkcomet-rat.com/

DarkComet is a remote access trojan (RAT) developed by Jean-Pierre Lesueur (known as DarkCoderSc), an independent programmer and computer security coder from France. Although the RAT was developed back in 2008, it began to proliferate at the start of 2012. The program was discontinued, partially due to its use in the Syrian civil war to monitor activists but also due to its author's fear of being arrested for unnamed reasons. As of August 2018, the program's development "has ceased indefinitely", and downloads are no longer offered on its official website.

DarkComet allows a user to control the system with a graphical user interface. It has many features which allows a user to use it as administrative remote help tool; however, DarkComet has many features which can be used maliciously. DarkComet is commonly used to spy on the victims by taking screen captures, key-logging, or password stealing.

== History of DarkComet ==
=== Syria ===
In 2011 to 2014, DarkComet was linked to the Syrian conflict. People in Syria began using secure connections to bypass the government's censorship and the surveillance of the internet. This caused the Syrian Government to resort to using RATs to spy on its civilians. Many believe that this is what caused the arrests of many activists within Syria.

The RAT was distributed via a "booby-trapped Skype chat message" which consisted of a message with a Facebook icon which was actually an executable file that was designed to install DarkComet. Once infected, the victim's machine would try to send the message to other people with the same booby-trapped Skype chat message.

Once DarkComet was linked to the Syrian regime, Lesueur stopped developing the tool, stating, “I never imagined it would be used by a government for spying,” he said. “If I had known that, I would never have created such a tool.”

=== African hackers ===
In 2012, Arbos Network company found evidence of DarkComet being used to target military systems and gamers by unknown hackers from Africa. At the time, they mainly targeted the United States.

=== Je Suis Charlie ===
In the wake of the January 7, 2015, attack on the Charlie Hebdo magazine in Paris, hackers used the "#JeSuisCharlie" slogan to trick people into downloading DarkComet. DarkComet was disguised as a picture of a newborn baby whose wristband read "Je suis Charlie." Once the picture was downloaded, the users became compromised. Hackers took advantage of the disaster to compromise as many systems as possible. DarkComet was spotted within 24 hours of the attack.

== Architecture and features ==
=== Architecture ===
DarkComet, like many other RATs, uses a reverse-socket architecture. The uninfected computer with a GUI enabling control of infected ones is the client, while the infected systems (without a GUI) are servers.

When DarkComet executes, the server connects to the client and allows the client to control and monitor the server. At this point the client can use any of the features which the GUI contains. A socket is opened on the server and waits to receive packets from the controller, and executes the commands when received. In some cases, the malware may use system utilities to evade detection and gain persistence. For example, it can employ the T1564.001 technique by starting attrib.exe through cmd.exe to hide the main executable.

=== Features ===
The following list of features is not exhaustive but are the critical ones that make DarkComet a dangerous tool. Many of these features can be used to completely take over a system and allows the client full access when granted via UAC.

- Spy Functions
  - Webcam Capture
  - Sound Capture
  - Remote Desktop
  - Keylogger
- Network Functions
  - Active Ports
  - Network Shares
  - Server Socks5
  - LAN Computers
  - Net Gateway
  - IP Scanner
  - Url Download
  - Browse Page
  - Redirect IP/Port
  - WiFi Access Points
- Computer Power
  - Poweroff
  - Shutdown
  - Restart
  - Logoff
- Server Actions
  - Lock Computer
  - Restart Server
  - Close Server
  - Uninstall Server
  - Upload and Execute
  - Remote Edit Service
- Update Server
  - From URL
  - From File

DarkComet also has some "Fun Features".

- Fun Features
  - Fun Manager
  - Piano
  - Message Box
  - Microsoft Reader
  - Remote Chat

== Detection ==
DarkComet is a widely known piece of malware. If a user installs an antivirus, or a DarkComet remover, they can un-infect their computer quickly. Its target machines are typically anything from Windows XP, all the way up to Windows 10.

Common anti-virus tags for a DarkComet application are as follow:

- Trojan[Backdoor]/Win32.DarkKomet.xyk
- BDS/DarkKomet.GS
- Backdoor.Win32.DarkKomet!O
- RAT.DarkComet

When a computer is infected, it tries to create a connection via socket to the controller’s computer. Once the connection has been established the infected computer listens for commands from the controller, if the controller sends out a command, the infected computer receives it, and executes whatever function is sent.
