= Cisco ASA =

Line of computer network security devices

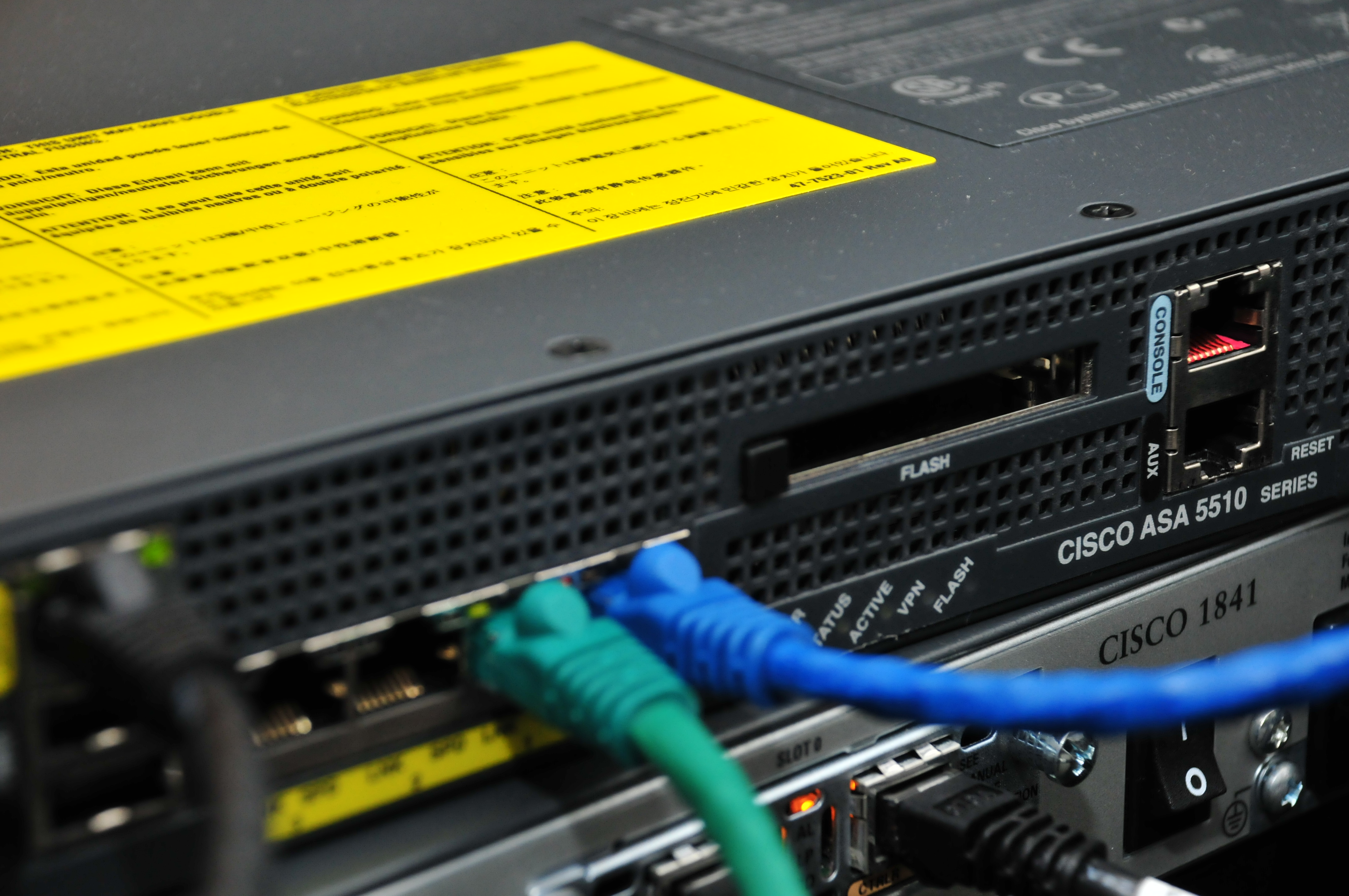
Cisco ASA 5510

The Cisco ASA 5500 Series Adaptive Security Appliances, or simply Cisco ASA, is Cisco's line of network security devices introduced in May 2005. It succeeded three existing lines of Cisco products: the Cisco PIX firewall and NAT device in 2008, the Cisco IPS 4200 Series, and the Cisco VPN 3000 Series Concentrators.

The Cisco ASA is a unified threat management device which combines several network security functions. It has become one of the most widely used firewall/VPN solutions for small to medium-sized businesses. Early reviews indicated the Cisco GUI tools for managing the device were lacking.

== History ==
A security flaw was identified when users customized the Clientless SSL VPN option of their ASA's but was rectified in 2015.

In 2017 The Shadow Brokers revealed the existence of two privilege escalation exploits against the ASA called EPICBANANA and EXTRABACON. A code insertion implant called BANANAGLEE, was made persistent by JETPLOW.

In 2018, a flaw in a WebVPN feature (CVE-2018-0101) which allowed for remote code execution was patched.

In 2025, a spike in traffic scanning for Cisco ASA devices was found by security experts who suggested that a vulnerability may be known by hackers. A week later, nearly 50,000 devices were announced to be affected by two more flaws allowing for remote code execution and access to restricted VPN endpoints was disclosed. Tracked as CVE-2025-20333 and CVE-2025-20362, the vulnerabilities were being actively exploited at the time of their disclosure. Cisco shared that there was no fix available for the two vulnerabilities at the time. In response, the United States of America's Cybersecurity and Infrastructure Security Agency directed federal agencies to identify any compromised units. The United Kingdom's National Cyber Security Centre also posted a warning informing businesses and the wider public about the issue.

== Architecture ==
The ASA software is based on Linux. It runs a single Executable and Linkable Format program called lina. This schedules processes internally rather than using the Linux facilities. In the boot sequence a boot loader called ROMMON (ROM monitor) starts, loads a Linux kernel, which then loads the lina_monitor, which then loads lina. The ROMMON also has a command line that can be used to load or select other software images and configurations. The names of firmware files includes a version indicator, -smp means it is for a symmetrical multiprocessor (and 64 bit architecture), and different parts also indicate if 3DES or AES is supported or not.

The ASA software has a similar interface to the Cisco IOS software on routers. There is a command line interface (CLI) that can be used to query operate or configure the device. In config mode the configuration statements are entered. The configuration is initially in memory as a running-config but would normally be saved to flash memory.

Versions 7.0 to 9.0, plus 9.3 and 9.5 reached their end of life. The final version of software for the 5505-5550 models was released in 2014.

== Models ==
=== 55 Series (2010–2018) ===
The 5505 introduced in 2010 was a desktop unit designed for small enterprises or branch offices. It included features to reduce the need for other equipment, such as an inbuilt switch, and power over Ethernet ports. The 5585-X is a higher powered unit for datacenters introduced in 2010. It runs in 32-bit mode on an Intel architecture Atom chip.

Model	5505	5510	5520	5540	5550	5580-20	5580-40	5585-X SSP10	5585-X SSP20	5585-X SSP40	5585-X SSP60
Cleartext throughput, Mbit/s	150	300	450	650	1,200	5,000	10,000	3,000	7,000	12,000	20,000
AES/Triple DES throughput, Mbit/s	100	170	225	325	425	1,000	1,000	1,000	2,000	3,000	5,000
Max simultaneous connections	10,000 (25,000 with Sec Plus License)	50,000 (130,000 with Sec Plus License)	280,000	400,000	650,000	1,000,000	2,000,000	1,000,000	2,000,000	4,000,000	10,000,000
Max site-to-site and remote access VPN sessions	10 (25 with Sec Plus License)	250	750	5,000	5,000	10,000	10,000	5,000	10,000	10,000	10,000
Max number of SSL VPN user sessions	25	250	750	2,500	5,000	10,000	10,000	5,000	10,000	10,000	10,000
Model	5505	5510	5520	5540	5550	5580-20	5580-40	5585-X SSP10	5585-X SSP20	5585-X SSP40	5585-X SSP60

Cisco determined that most of the low end devices had too little capacity to include the features needed, such as anti-virus, or sandboxing, and so introduced a new line of next-generation firewalls called Firepower. These run in 64-bit mode.

=== Firepower (2018+ models) ===
The newer 5512-X, 5515-X, 5525-X, 5545-X and 5555-X can have an extra interface card added. The 5585-X also supports an optional security services processor. The ASA 5585-X has a slot for an I/O module which can be subdivided into two half width modules.

Model	5506-X	5506W-X	5506H-X	5508-X	5512-X	5515-X	5516-X	5525-X	5545-X	5555-X	5585-X
Throughput Gb/s	0.25	0.25	0.25	0.45	0.3	0.5	0.85	1.1	1.5	1.75	4-40
GB ports	8	8	4	8	6	6	8	8	8	8	6-8
Ten GB ports	0	0	0	0	0	0	0	0	0	0	2-4
Form factor	desktop	desktop	desktop	1 RU	1 RU	1 RU	1 RU	1RU	1RU	1RU	2RU
