= MiniPanzer and MegaPanzer =

IT trojans

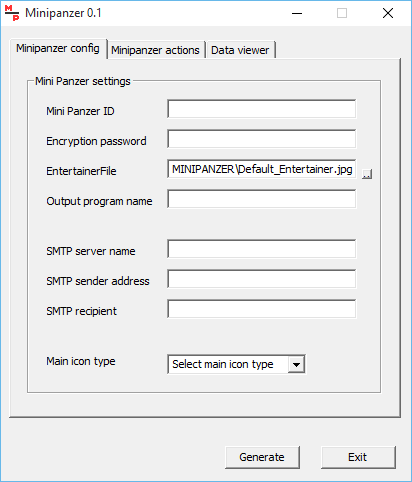
- A screenshot of the software MiniPanzer showing some of its configuration settings
- Original author: Ruben Unteregger
- Release: 2009; 17 years ago
- Preview release: 0.1 / 17 February 2016; 10 years ago
- Written in: C++
- Operating system: Windows
- Platform: x86
- Available in: English
- License: GPLv3
- Website: sourceforge.net/projects/mini-panzer

MiniPanzer and MegaPanzer are two variants of Bundestrojaner (German for federal Trojan horse) written for ERA IT Solutions (a Swiss federal government contractor) by software engineer Ruben Unteregger, and later used by Switzerland's Federal Department of Environment, Transport, Energy and Communications (UVEK) to intercept Skype and more generally voice over IP traffic on Windows XP systems.

The source code of the program was released under the GNU General Public License version 3 (GPLv3) in 2009 by their author, who retained the copyright. Thereafter, the trojan was apparently detected in the wild. One of its designations given by anti-virus companies was Trojan.Peskyspy.

The malware used DLL injection.
