= KDE Software Compilation =

Desktop environment and an associated range of KDE Applications produced by KDE

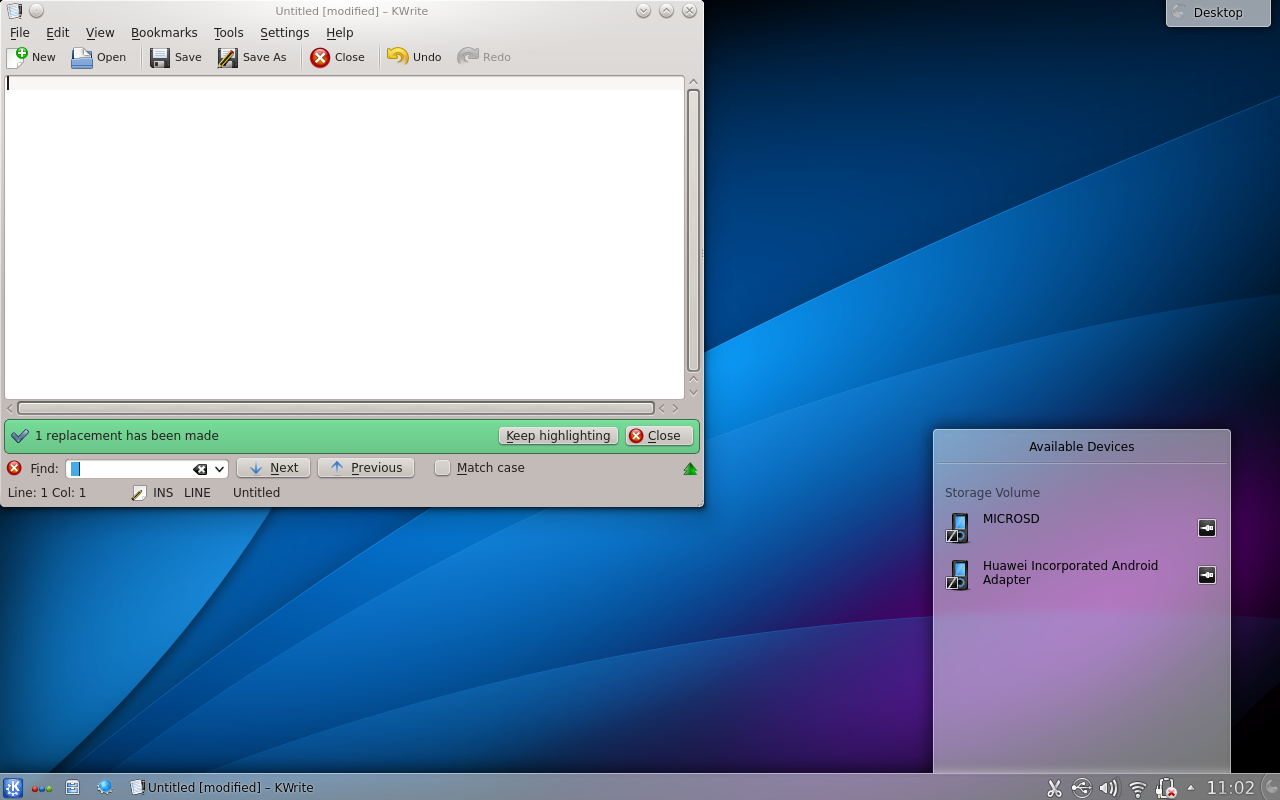
- KDE Plasma 4 (graphical shell)
- Developer: KDE
- Release: 1.0 / 12 July 1998; 28 years ago
- Final release: 4.14.3 (November 11, 2014; 11 years ago) [±]
- Written in: Mainly C++ (Qt), some C
- Operating system: Entire DE: Unix-like with X11 or Wayland and also Windows XP–7. Applications only: Mac OS X 10.4–10.6
- Available in: 86 languages
- List of languages: Full (52): Arabic, Basque, Bosnian, Brazilian Portuguese, British English, Catalan, Catalan (Valencian), Chinese Simplified, Chinese Traditional, Croatian, Czech, Danish, Dutch, Esperanto, Estonian, Farsi (Persian), Finnish, French, Galician, German, Greek, Hebrew, Hindi, Hungarian, Icelandic, Indonesian, Interlingua, Irish Gaelic, Italian, Japanese, Kazakh, Khmer, Korean, Latvian, Lithuanian, Low Saxon, Marathi, Norwegian Bokmål, Norwegian Nynorsk, Polish, Portuguese, Punjabi, Romanian, Russian, Serbian, Slovak, Slovenian, Spanish, Swedish, Turkish, Ukrainian, Uyghur; Partial (34): Afrikaans, Armenian, Assamese, Asturian, Belarusian (Latin), Bengali, Bengali (India), Breton, Bulgarian, Chhattisgarhi, West Frisian, Gujarati, Kannada, Kashubian, Kurdish, Macedonian, Maithili, Malay, Malayalam, Northern Sami, Oriya, Pashto, Sinhala, Tajik, Tamil, Tatarish, Telugu, Thai, Upper Sorbian, Uzbek, Uzbek (Cyrillic), Vietnamese, Walloon
- Type: Desktop environment
- License: GNU GPL, GNU LGPL, BSD License, MIT License
- Website: kde.org

The KDE Software Compilation (KDE SC) was an umbrella term for the desktop environment plus a range of included applications produced by KDE. From its 1.0 release in July 1998 until the release of version 4.4 in February 2010, the Software Compilation was simply known as KDE, which stood for K Desktop Environment until the rebrand. The then called KDE SC was used from 4.4 onward until the final release 4.14 in July 2014. It consisted of the KDE Plasma 4 desktop and those KDE applications, whose development teams chose to follow the Software Compilation's release schedule. After that, the KDE SC was split into three separate product entities: KDE Plasma, KDE Frameworks and KDE Applications, each with their own independent release schedules.

== History ==
=== Origins ===
KDE was founded in 1996 by Matthias Ettrich, who was then a student at the University of Tübingen. At the time, he was troubled by certain aspects of the Unix desktop. Among his qualms was that none of the applications looked, felt, or worked alike. He proposed the formation of not only a set of applications, but, rather, a desktop environment, in which users could expect things to look, feel and work consistently. He also wanted to make this desktop easy to use; one of his complaints with desktop applications of the time was that his girlfriend could not use them. His initial Usenet post spurred a lot of interest, and the KDE project was born.

Ettrich chose to use Trolltech's Qt framework for the KDE project. Other programmers quickly started developing KDE/Qt applications, and by early 1997, a few applications were being released.

=== First series ===
K Desktop Environment 1.0

On 12 July 1998, K Desktop Environment 1.0 was released. In November 1998, the Qt toolkit was dual-licensed under the free/open source Q Public License (QPL) and a proprietary license for proprietary software developers. Debate continued about compatibility with the GNU General Public License (GPL), so in September 2000, Trolltech made the Unix version of the Qt libraries available under the GPL, in addition to the QPL. Trolltech continued to require licenses for developing proprietary software with Qt. The core libraries of KDE are collectively licensed under the GNU LGPL, but the only way for proprietary software to make use of them was to be developed under the terms of the Qt proprietary license.

=== Second series ===
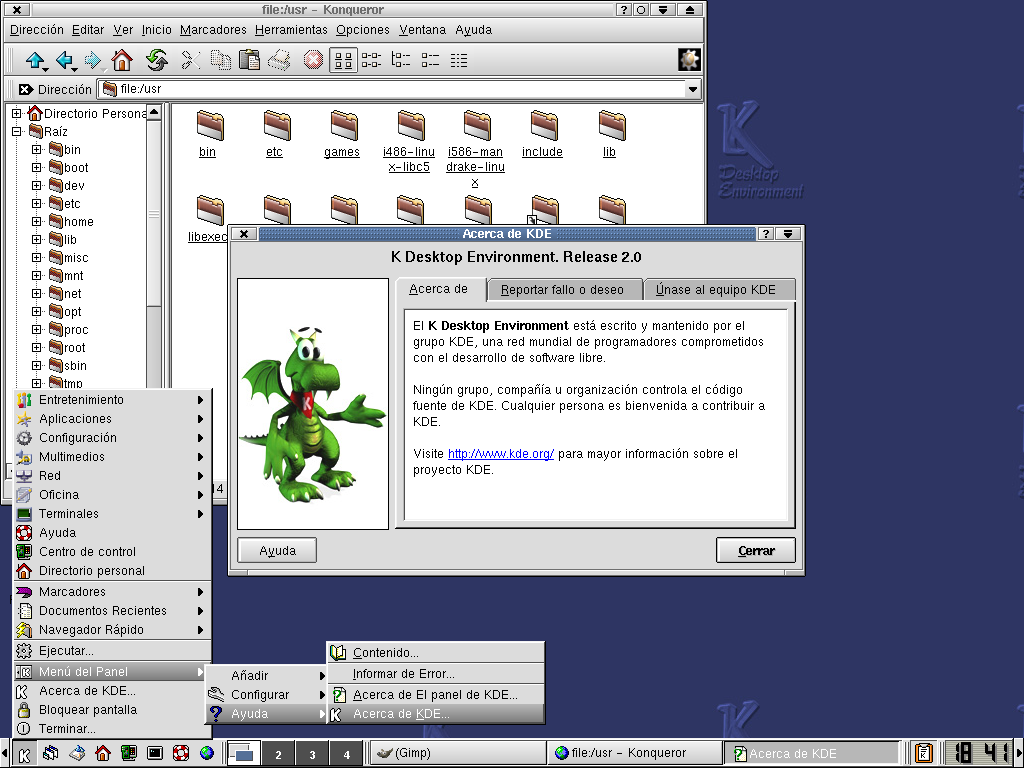
K Desktop Environment 2.0

Beginning 23 October 2000, the second series of releases, K Desktop Environment 2, introduced significant technological improvements. These included DCOP (Desktop COmmunication Protocol), KIO (an application I/O library), KParts (a Component Object Model, which allows an application to embed another within itself), and KHTML (an HTML rendering and drawing engine).

=== Third series ===
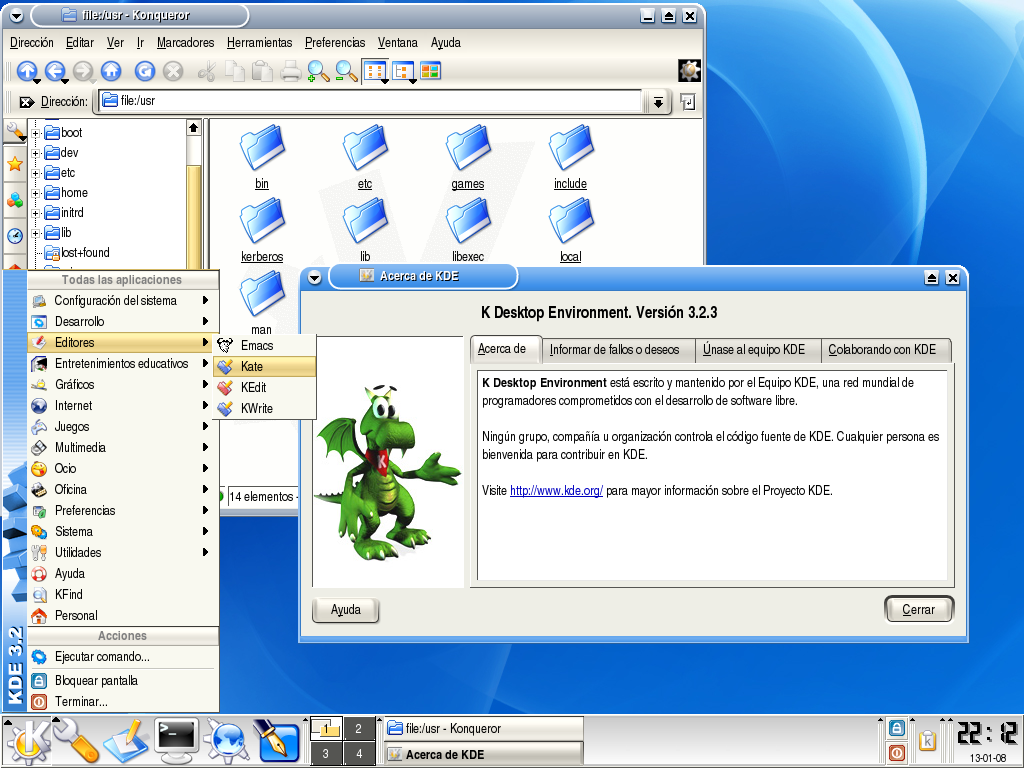
KDE 3.2 with Konqueror and the About screen

The third series was much larger than previous series, consisting of six major releases starting on 3 April 2002. The API changes between K Desktop Environment 2 and K Desktop Environment 3 were comparatively minor, meaning that the KDE 3 can be seen as largely a continuation of the K Desktop Environment 2 series. All releases of K Desktop Environment 3 were built upon Qt 3, which was only released under the GPL for Linux and Unix-like operating systems, including Mac OS X. It is marked stable running on Mac OS X since 2008. Unlike KDE SC 4, however, it requires an X11 server to operate. In 2002, members of the KDE on Cygwin project began porting the GPL licensed Qt/X11 code base to Windows.

=== Fourth series ===
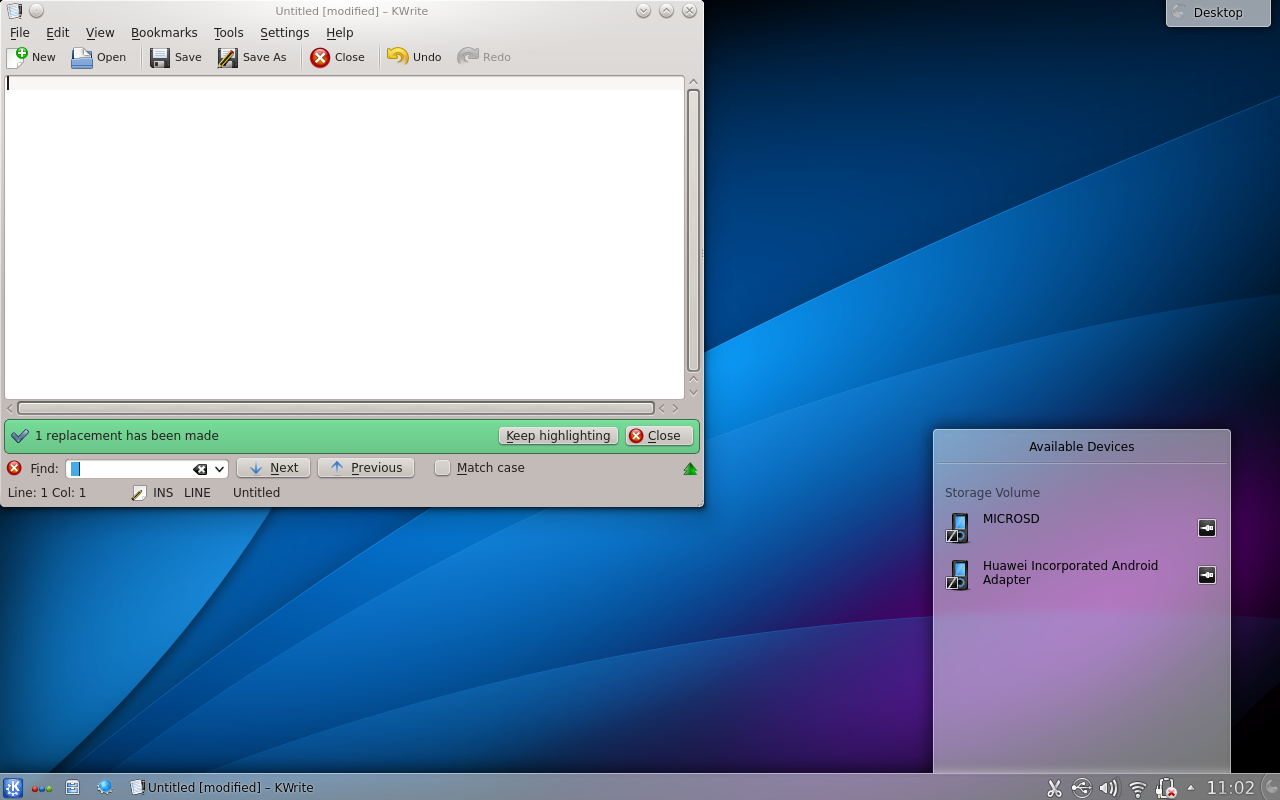
Latest Plasma Desktop in KDE Software Compilation 4.10

KDE Software Compilation 4, first released on 11 January 2008, is based on Qt 4, which is also released under the GPL for Windows and Mac OS X. Therefore, KDE SC 4 applications can be compiled and run natively on these operating systems as well. KDE Software Compilation 4 on Mac OS X is currently considered beta, while on Windows it is not in the final state, so applications can be unsuitable for day to day use.

KDE SC 4 includes many new technologies and technical changes. The centerpiece is a redesigned desktop and panels collectively called Plasma, which replaces Kicker, KDesktop, and SuperKaramba by integrating their functionality into one piece of technology; Plasma is intended to be more configurable for those wanting to update the decades-old desktop metaphor. There are a number of new frameworks, including Phonon (a new multimedia interface making KDE independent of any one specific media backend) Solid (an API for network and portable devices), and Decibel (a new communication framework to integrate all communication protocols into the desktop). Also featured is a metadata and search framework, incorporating Strigi as a full-text file indexing service, and NEPOMUK with KDE integration.

Starting with Qt 4.5, Qt was also made available under the LGPL version 2.1, a major step for KDE adoption in corporate and proprietary environments, as the LGPL permits proprietary applications to link to libraries licensed under the LGPL.

=== Post-fourth series ===
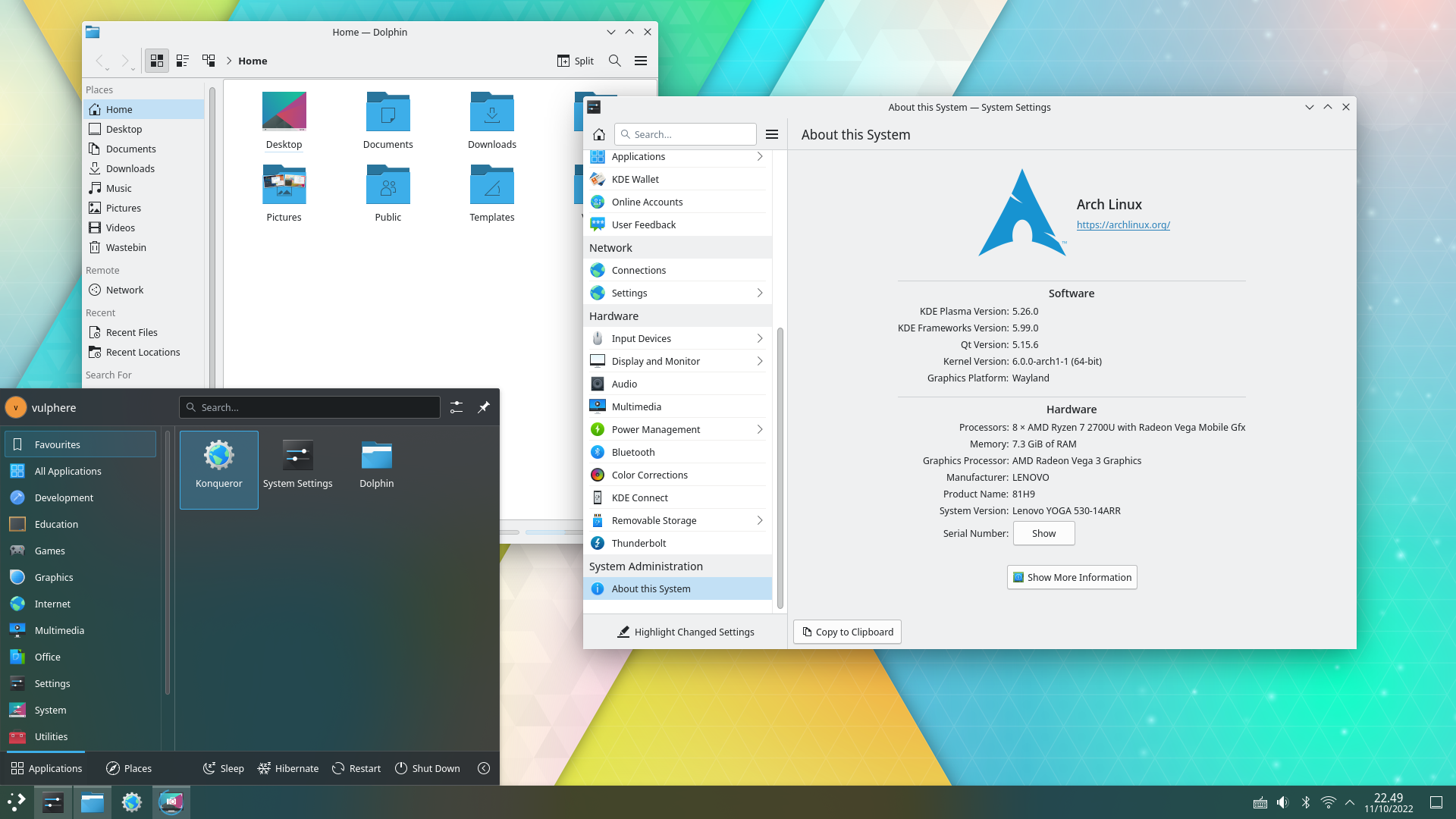
KDE Plasma 5.26 with Breeze Twilight theme, mix of dark and light color scheme.

As of August 2014, KDE no longer provides synchronized releases of the entire software compilation; instead the software is split into three parts:

- KDE Frameworks 5, a collection of libraries and software frameworks (5.0 released on 7 July 2014, and new major releases are made monthly)
- KDE Plasma 5, a desktop environment (5.0 released on 15 July 2014, and new major releases are made every three months)
- KDE Applications, a bundle of applications and supporting libraries (14.12 was the first version incorporating Frameworks 5 based applications, and introduced date-based version numbers).

Major changes include a move from Qt 4 to Qt 5, support for the next-generation display server protocol Wayland, support for the next-generation rendering API Vulkan and modularization of the KDE core libraries. Initial releases of Frameworks 5 and Plasma 5 were made available in July 2014.

The releases KDE Frameworks 5, KDE Plasma 5 and KDE Applications 5 are not one singular entity. These parts have been only released together, and cobbling them up under one name really has not been helpful. 3rd party developers thought they would only target Plasma Workspaces, Plasma users have thought you’ll only be able to run "KDE apps", potential users of applications will assume that you can only use them inside Plasma workspaces – all of them untrue, all of them taken right out of my daily experience.

== Development ==
=== Source code ===
KDE SC releases are made to the KDE FTP server in the form of source code with configure scripts, which are compiled by operating system vendors and integrated with the rest of their systems before distribution. Most vendors use only stable and tested versions of KDE SC, providing it in the form of easily installable, pre-compiled packages. The source code of every stable and development version of KDE SC is stored in the KDE source code repository, using Git. KDE Platform is licensed under the LGPL, BSD license, MIT license, or X11 license. Applications also allow GPL. Documentation also allow FDL. CMake modules must be licensed under the BSD licence.

=== Major releases ===
Major releases are releases that begin a series (version number X.0). These releases are allowed to break binary compatibility with the predecessor, or to put it differently, all following releases (X.1, X.2, ...) will guarantee binary portability (API & ABI). This means, for instance, that software that was developed for KDE 3.0 will work on all (future) KDE 3 releases; however, an application developed for KDE 2 is not guaranteed to be able to make use of the KDE 3 libraries. KDE major version numbers follow the Qt release cycle, meaning that KDE SC 4 is based on Qt 4, while KDE 3 was based on Qt 3.

Qt 5.0 was released 19 December 2012, Qt 5.2 12 December 2013. And for example KDE Frameworks 5.21.0 requires Qt >= 5.4, and no longer supports Qt 5.3 (cf. Qt version history).

=== Standard releases ===
There are two main types of standard releases: Feature releases and bugfix releases.

Feature releases have two version numbers, for example 3.5 and contain new features. As soon as a feature release is ready and announced, work on the next feature release starts. A feature release needs several months to be finished and many bugs that are fixed during this time are backported to the stable branch, meaning that these fixes are incorporated into the last stable release by bugfix releases. During the KDE SC 4 series, KDE SC had a feature release roughly every six months. Since the split, KDE Plasma releases a new feature version roughly every 3–4 months.

Bugfix releases have three version numbers, e.g. KDE 1.1.1, and focus on fixing bugs, minor glitches, and making small usability improvements. Bugfix releases in general do not allow new features, although some releases include small enhancements. A shortened release schedule is used. Starting with the KDE SC 4 series, KDE SC has a maintenance release roughly every month, except during the month of a feature release, while with Plasma 5, bugfix releases tend to happen even shorter like 2–3 weeks.

=== Release cycle ===
Timeline of major releases
Date	Release				
14 October 1996	Project announced by Matthias Ettrich				
KDE 1
12 July 1998	KDE 1.0				
6 February 1999	KDE 1.1				
KDE 2
23 October 2000	KDE 2.0				
26 February 2001	KDE 2.1				
15 August 2001	KDE 2.2				
KDE 3
3 April 2002	KDE 3.0				
28 January 2003	KDE 3.1				
3 February 2004	KDE 3.2				
19 August 2004	KDE 3.3				
16 March 2005	KDE 3.4				
29 November 2005	KDE 3.5				
KDE SC 4
11 January 2008	KDE 4.0				
29 July 2008	KDE 4.1				
27 January 2009	KDE 4.2				
4 August 2009	KDE 4.3				
9 February 2010	KDE SC 4.4				
10 August 2010	KDE SC 4.5				
26 January 2011	KDE SC 4.6				
27 July 2011	KDE SC 4.7				
25 January 2012	KDE SC 4.8				
1 August 2012	KDE SC 4.9				
5 February 2013	KDE SC 4.10				
14 August 2013	KDE SC 4.11 KDE Plasma 4 feature freeze + LTS until August 2015				
18 December 2013	KDE SC 4.12				
16 April 2014	KDE SC 4.13				
31 July 2014	KDE SC 4.14 released; Some Applications are based on KDE Platform 4, some on KDE Frameworks 5				
KDE Qt5-based software
Date	Release	Date	Release	Date	Release
KDE Frameworks 5		KDE Plasma 5		KDE Applications / KDE Gear	
7 July 2014	KDE Frameworks 5.0	15 July 2014	KDE Plasma 5.0		
7 August 2014	KDE Frameworks 5.1	15 July 2014	KDE Plasma 5.0		
12 September 2014	KDE Frameworks 5.2	15 July 2014	KDE Plasma 5.0		
7 October 2014	KDE Frameworks 5.3	15 October 2014	KDE Plasma 5.1		
6 November 2014	KDE Frameworks 5.4	15 October 2014	KDE Plasma 5.1		
11 December 2014	KDE Frameworks 5.5	15 October 2014	KDE Plasma 5.1	17 December 2014	KDE Applications 14.12
8 January 2015	KDE Frameworks 5.6	27 January 2015	KDE Plasma 5.2	17 December 2014	KDE Applications 14.12
14 February 2015	KDE Frameworks 5.7	27 January 2015	KDE Plasma 5.2	17 December 2014	KDE Applications 14.12
13 March 2015	KDE Frameworks 5.8	27 January 2015	KDE Plasma 5.2	17 December 2014	KDE Applications 14.12
10 April 2015	KDE Frameworks 5.9	28 April 2015	KDE Plasma 5.3	15 April 2015	KDE Applications 15.04
8 May 2015	KDE Frameworks 5.10	28 April 2015	KDE Plasma 5.3	15 April 2015	KDE Applications 15.04
12 June 2015	KDE Frameworks 5.11	28 April 2015	KDE Plasma 5.3	15 April 2015	KDE Applications 15.04
10 July 2015	KDE Frameworks 5.12	28 April 2015	KDE Plasma 5.3	15 April 2015	KDE Applications 15.04
12 August 2015	KDE Frameworks 5.13	25 August 2015	KDE Plasma 5.4	19 August 2015	KDE Applications 15.08
12 September 2015	KDE Frameworks 5.14	25 August 2015	KDE Plasma 5.4	19 August 2015	KDE Applications 15.08
10 October 2015	KDE Frameworks 5.15	25 August 2015	KDE Plasma 5.4	19 August 2015	KDE Applications 15.08
13 November 2015	KDE Frameworks 5.16	25 August 2015	KDE Plasma 5.4	19 August 2015	KDE Applications 15.08
12 December 2015	KDE Frameworks 5.17	8 December 2015	KDE Plasma 5.5	16 December 2015	KDE Applications 15.12
9 January 2016	KDE Frameworks 5.18	8 December 2015	KDE Plasma 5.5	16 December 2015	KDE Applications 15.12
13 February 2016	KDE Frameworks 5.19	8 December 2015	KDE Plasma 5.5	16 December 2015	KDE Applications 15.12
13 March 2016	KDE Frameworks 5.20	22 March 2016	KDE Plasma 5.6	16 December 2015	KDE Applications 15.12
9 April 2016	KDE Frameworks 5.21	22 March 2016	KDE Plasma 5.6	20 April 2016	KDE Applications 16.04 LTS
15 May 2016	KDE Frameworks 5.22	22 March 2016	KDE Plasma 5.6	20 April 2016	KDE Applications 16.04 LTS
13 June 2016	KDE Frameworks 5.23	22 March 2016	KDE Plasma 5.6	20 April 2016	KDE Applications 16.04 LTS
9 July 2016	KDE Frameworks 5.24	5 July 2016	KDE Plasma 5.7	20 April 2016	KDE Applications 16.04 LTS
13 August 2016	KDE Frameworks 5.25	5 July 2016	KDE Plasma 5.7	18 August 2016	KDE Applications 16.08
10 September 2016	KDE Frameworks 5.26	5 July 2016	KDE Plasma 5.7	18 August 2016	KDE Applications 16.08
8 October 2016	KDE Frameworks 5.27	4 October 2016	KDE Plasma 5.8 LTS	18 August 2016	KDE Applications 16.08
15 November 2016	KDE Frameworks 5.28	4 October 2016	KDE Plasma 5.8 LTS	18 August 2016	KDE Applications 16.08
12 December 2016	KDE Frameworks 5.29	4 October 2016	KDE Plasma 5.8 LTS	15 December 2016	KDE Applications 16.12
14 January 2017	KDE Frameworks 5.30	31 January 2017	KDE Plasma 5.9	15 December 2016	KDE Applications 16.12
11 February 2017	KDE Frameworks 5.31	31 January 2017	KDE Plasma 5.9	15 December 2016	KDE Applications 16.12
11 March 2017	KDE Frameworks 5.32	31 January 2017	KDE Plasma 5.9	15 December 2016	KDE Applications 16.12
8 April 2017	KDE Frameworks 5.33	31 January 2017	KDE Plasma 5.9	20 April 2017	KDE Applications 17.04
13 May 2017	KDE Frameworks 5.34	30 May 2017	KDE Plasma 5.10	20 April 2017	KDE Applications 17.04
10 June 2017	KDE Frameworks 5.35	30 May 2017	KDE Plasma 5.10	20 April 2017	KDE Applications 17.04
8 July 2017	KDE Frameworks 5.36	30 May 2017	KDE Plasma 5.10	20 April 2017	KDE Applications 17.04
13 August 2017	KDE Frameworks 5.37	30 May 2017	KDE Plasma 5.10	17 August 2017	KDE Applications 17.08
9 September 2017	KDE Frameworks 5.38	30 May 2017	KDE Plasma 5.10	17 August 2017	KDE Applications 17.08
14 October 2017	KDE Frameworks 5.39	10 October 2017	KDE Plasma 5.11	17 August 2017	KDE Applications 17.08
11 November 2017	KDE Frameworks 5.40	10 October 2017	KDE Plasma 5.11	17 August 2017	KDE Applications 17.08
10 December 2017	KDE Frameworks 5.41	10 October 2017	KDE Plasma 5.11	14 December 2017	KDE Applications 17.12
13 January 2018	KDE Frameworks 5.42	10 October 2017	KDE Plasma 5.11	14 December 2017	KDE Applications 17.12
12 February 2018	KDE Frameworks 5.43	6 February 2018	KDE Plasma 5.12 LTS	14 December 2017	KDE Applications 17.12
10 March 2018	KDE Frameworks 5.44	6 February 2018	KDE Plasma 5.12 LTS	14 December 2017	KDE Applications 17.12
14 April 2018	KDE Frameworks 5.45	6 February 2018	KDE Plasma 5.12 LTS	19 April 2018	KDE Applications 18.04 LTS
12 May 2018	KDE Frameworks 5.46	6 February 2018	KDE Plasma 5.12 LTS	19 April 2018	KDE Applications 18.04 LTS
9 June 2018	KDE Frameworks 5.47	12 June 2018	KDE Plasma 5.13	19 April 2018	KDE Applications 18.04 LTS
14 July 2018	KDE Frameworks 5.48	12 June 2018	KDE Plasma 5.13	19 April 2018	KDE Applications 18.04 LTS
11 August 2018	KDE Frameworks 5.49	12 June 2018	KDE Plasma 5.13	16 August 2018	KDE Applications 18.08
8 September 2018	KDE Frameworks 5.50	12 June 2018	KDE Plasma 5.13	16 August 2018	KDE Applications 18.08
15 October 2018	KDE Frameworks 5.51	9 October 2018	KDE Plasma 5.14	16 August 2018	KDE Applications 18.08
10 November 2018	KDE Frameworks 5.52	9 October 2018	KDE Plasma 5.14	16 August 2018	KDE Applications 18.08
8 December 2018	KDE Frameworks 5.53	9 October 2018	KDE Plasma 5.14	13 December 2018	KDE Applications 18.12
12 January 2019	KDE Frameworks 5.54	9 October 2018	KDE Plasma 5.14	13 December 2018	KDE Applications 18.12
9 February 2019	KDE Frameworks 5.55	12 February 2019	KDE Plasma 5.15	13 December 2018	KDE Applications 18.12
9 March 2019	KDE Frameworks 5.56	12 February 2019	KDE Plasma 5.15	13 December 2018	KDE Applications 18.12
13 April 2019	KDE Frameworks 5.57	12 February 2019	KDE Plasma 5.15	18 April 2019	KDE Applications 19.04
13 May 2019	KDE Frameworks 5.58	12 February 2019	KDE Plasma 5.15	18 April 2019	KDE Applications 19.04
8 June 2019	KDE Frameworks 5.59	11 June 2019	KDE Plasma 5.16	18 April 2019	KDE Applications 19.04
13 July 2019	KDE Frameworks 5.60	11 June 2019	KDE Plasma 5.16	18 April 2019	KDE Applications 19.04
10 August 2019	KDE Frameworks 5.61	11 June 2019	KDE Plasma 5.16	15 August 2019	KDE Applications 19.08
14 September 2019	KDE Frameworks 5.62	11 June 2019	KDE Plasma 5.16	15 August 2019	KDE Applications 19.08
12 October 2019	KDE Frameworks 5.63	15 October 2019	KDE Plasma 5.17	15 August 2019	KDE Applications 19.08
10 November 2019	KDE Frameworks 5.64	15 October 2019	KDE Plasma 5.17	15 August 2019	KDE Applications 19.08
14 December 2019	KDE Frameworks 5.65	15 October 2019	KDE Plasma 5.17	12 December 2019	KDE Applications 19.12
11 January 2020	KDE Frameworks 5.66	15 October 2019	KDE Plasma 5.17	12 December 2019	KDE Applications 19.12
2 February 2020	KDE Frameworks 5.67	11 February 2020	KDE Plasma 5.18 LTS	12 December 2019	KDE Applications 19.12
7 March 2020	KDE Frameworks 5.68	11 February 2020	KDE Plasma 5.18 LTS	12 December 2019	KDE Applications 19.12
5 April 2020	KDE Frameworks 5.69	11 February 2020	KDE Plasma 5.18 LTS	23 April 2020	KDE Applications 20.04 LTS
2 May 2020	KDE Frameworks 5.70	11 February 2020	KDE Plasma 5.18 LTS	23 April 2020	KDE Applications 20.04 LTS
6 June 2020	KDE Frameworks 5.71	9 June 2020	KDE Plasma 5.19	23 April 2020	KDE Applications 20.04 LTS
4 July 2020	KDE Frameworks 5.72	9 June 2020	KDE Plasma 5.19	23 April 2020	KDE Applications 20.04 LTS
1 August 2020	KDE Frameworks 5.73	9 June 2020	KDE Plasma 5.19	13 August 2020	KDE Applications 20.08
6 September 2020	KDE Frameworks 5.74	9 June 2020	KDE Plasma 5.19	13 August 2020	KDE Applications 20.08
10 October 2020	KDE Frameworks 5.75	13 October 2020	KDE Plasma 5.20	13 August 2020	KDE Applications 20.08
7 November 2020	KDE Frameworks 5.76	13 October 2020	KDE Plasma 5.20	13 August 2020	KDE Applications 20.08
12 December 2020	KDE Frameworks 5.77	13 October 2020	KDE Plasma 5.20	10 December 2020	KDE Applications 20.12
9 January 2021	KDE Frameworks 5.78	13 October 2020	KDE Plasma 5.20	10 December 2020	KDE Applications 20.12
13 February 2021	KDE Frameworks 5.79	16 February 2021	KDE Plasma 5.21	10 December 2020	KDE Applications 20.12
13 March 2021	KDE Frameworks 5.80	16 February 2021	KDE Plasma 5.21	10 December 2020	KDE Applications 20.12
10 April 2021	KDE Frameworks 5.81	16 February 2021	KDE Plasma 5.21	22 April 2021	KDE Gear 21.04
8 May 2021	KDE Frameworks 5.82	16 February 2021	KDE Plasma 5.21	22 April 2021	KDE Gear 21.04
12 June 2021	KDE Frameworks 5.83	8 June 2021	KDE Plasma 5.22	22 April 2021	KDE Gear 21.04
10 July 2021	KDE Frameworks 5.84	8 June 2021	KDE Plasma 5.22	22 April 2021	KDE Gear 21.04
13 August 2021	KDE Frameworks 5.85	8 June 2021	KDE Plasma 5.22	12 August 2021	KDE Gear 21.08
11 September 2021	KDE Frameworks 5.86	8 June 2021	KDE Plasma 5.22	12 August 2021	KDE Gear 21.08
9 October 2021	KDE Frameworks 5.87	14 October 2021	KDE Plasma 5.23	12 August 2021	KDE Gear 21.08
13 November 2021	KDE Frameworks 5.88	14 October 2021	KDE Plasma 5.23	12 August 2021	KDE Gear 21.08
11 December 2021	KDE Frameworks 5.89	14 October 2021	KDE Plasma 5.23	9 December 2021	KDE Gear 21.12
8 January 2022	KDE Frameworks 5.90	14 October 2021	KDE Plasma 5.23	9 December 2021	KDE Gear 21.12
13 February 2022	KDE Frameworks 5.91	8 February 2022	KDE Plasma 5.24 LTS	9 December 2021	KDE Gear 21.12
12 March 2022	KDE Frameworks 5.92	8 February 2022	KDE Plasma 5.24 LTS	9 December 2021	KDE Gear 21.12
9 April 2022	KDE Frameworks 5.93	8 February 2022	KDE Plasma 5.24 LTS	21 April 2022	KDE Gear 22.04 LTS
14 May 2022	KDE Frameworks 5.94	8 February 2022	KDE Plasma 5.24 LTS	21 April 2022	KDE Gear 22.04 LTS
12 June 2022	KDE Frameworks 5.95	14 June 2022	KDE Plasma 5.25	21 April 2022	KDE Gear 22.04 LTS
9 July 2022	KDE Frameworks 5.96	14 June 2022	KDE Plasma 5.25	21 April 2022	KDE Gear 22.04 LTS
14 August 2022	KDE Frameworks 5.97	14 June 2022	KDE Plasma 5.25	18 August 2022	KDE Gear 22.08
12 September 2022	KDE Frameworks 5.98	14 June 2022	KDE Plasma 5.25	18 August 2022	KDE Gear 22.08
9 October 2022	KDE Frameworks 5.99	11 October 2022	KDE Plasma 5.26	18 August 2022	KDE Gear 22.08
14 November 2022	KDE Frameworks 5.100	11 October 2022	KDE Plasma 5.26	18 August 2022	KDE Gear 22.08
10 December 2022	KDE Frameworks 5.101	11 October 2022	KDE Plasma 5.26	8 December 2022	KDE Gear 22.12
14 January 2023	KDE Frameworks 5.102	11 October 2022	KDE Plasma 5.26	8 December 2022	KDE Gear 22.12
11 February 2023	KDE Frameworks 5.103	14 February 2023	KDE Plasma 5.27 LTS	8 December 2022	KDE Gear 22.12
12 March 2023	KDE Frameworks 5.104	14 February 2023	KDE Plasma 5.27 LTS	8 December 2022	KDE Gear 22.12
8 April 2023	KDE Frameworks 5.105	14 February 2023	KDE Plasma 5.27 LTS	20 April 2023	KDE Gear 23.04
13 May 2023	KDE Frameworks 5.106	14 February 2023	KDE Plasma 5.27 LTS	20 April 2023	KDE Gear 23.04
10 June 2023	KDE Frameworks 5.107	14 February 2023	KDE Plasma 5.27 LTS	20 April 2023	KDE Gear 23.04
8 July 2023	KDE Frameworks 5.108	14 February 2023	KDE Plasma 5.27 LTS	20 April 2023	KDE Gear 23.04
17 August 2023	KDE Frameworks 5.109	14 February 2023	KDE Plasma 5.27 LTS	24 August 2023	KDE Gear 23.08
10 September 2023	KDE Frameworks 5.110	14 February 2023	KDE Plasma 5.27 LTS	24 August 2023	KDE Gear 23.08
18 October 2023	KDE Frameworks 5.111	14 February 2023	KDE Plasma 5.27 LTS	24 August 2023	KDE Gear 23.08
12 November 2023	KDE Frameworks 5.112	14 February 2023	KDE Plasma 5.27 LTS	24 August 2023	KDE Gear 23.08
14 December 2023	KDE Frameworks 5.113	14 February 2023	KDE Plasma 5.27 LTS	24 August 2023	KDE Gear 23.08
13 January 2024	KDE Frameworks 5.114	14 February 2023	KDE Plasma 5.27 LTS	24 August 2023	KDE Gear 23.08
10 February 2024	KDE Frameworks 5.115	14 February 2023	KDE Plasma 5.27 LTS	24 August 2023	KDE Gear 23.08
19 May 2024	KDE Frameworks 5.116	14 February 2023	KDE Plasma 5.27 LTS	24 August 2023	KDE Gear 23.08
KDE Qt6-based software
Date	Release	Date	Release	Date	Release
KDE Frameworks 6		KDE Plasma 6		KDE Gear	
28 February 2024	KDE Frameworks 6.0	28 February 2024	KDE Plasma 6.0	28 February 2024	KDE Gear 24.02
12 April 2024	KDE Frameworks 6.1	28 February 2024	KDE Plasma 6.0	28 February 2024	KDE Gear 24.02
10 May 2024	KDE Frameworks 6.2	28 February 2024	KDE Plasma 6.0	23 May 2024	KDE Gear 24.05
7 June 2024	KDE Frameworks 6.3	18 June 2024	KDE Plasma 6.1	23 May 2024	KDE Gear 24.05
12 July 2024	KDE Frameworks 6.4	18 June 2024	KDE Plasma 6.1	23 May 2024	KDE Gear 24.05
9 August 2024	KDE Frameworks 6.5	18 June 2024	KDE Plasma 6.1	22 August 2024	KDE Gear 24.08
13 September 2024	KDE Frameworks 6.6	18 June 2024	KDE Plasma 6.1	22 August 2024	KDE Gear 24.08
11 October 2024	KDE Frameworks 6.7	8 October 2024	KDE Plasma 6.2	22 August 2024	KDE Gear 24.08
8 November 2024	KDE Frameworks 6.8	8 October 2024	KDE Plasma 6.2	22 August 2024	KDE Gear 24.08
13 December 2024	KDE Frameworks 6.9	8 October 2024	KDE Plasma 6.2	12 December 2024	KDE Gear 24.12
9 January 2025	KDE Frameworks 6.10	8 October 2024	KDE Plasma 6.2	12 December 2024	KDE Gear 24.12
14 February 2025	KDE Frameworks 6.11	11 February 2025	KDE Plasma 6.3	12 December 2024	KDE Gear 24.12
14 March 2025	KDE Frameworks 6.12	11 February 2025	KDE Plasma 6.3	12 December 2024	KDE Gear 24.12
11 April 2025	KDE Frameworks 6.13	11 February 2025	KDE Plasma 6.3	17 April 2025	KDE Gear 25.04
9 May 2025	KDE Frameworks 6.14	11 February 2025	KDE Plasma 6.3	17 April 2025	KDE Gear 25.04
13 June 2025	KDE Frameworks 6.15	17 June 2025	KDE Plasma 6.4	17 April 2025	KDE Gear 25.04
11 July 2025	KDE Frameworks 6.16	17 June 2025	KDE Plasma 6.4	17 April 2025	KDE Gear 25.04
8 August 2025	KDE Frameworks 6.17	17 June 2025	KDE Plasma 6.4	14 August 2025	KDE Gear 25.08
12 September 2025	KDE Frameworks 6.18	17 June 2025	KDE Plasma 6.4	14 August 2025	KDE Gear 25.08
10 October 2025	KDE Frameworks 6.19	21 October 2025	KDE Plasma 6.5	14 August 2025	KDE Gear 25.08
14 November 2025	KDE Frameworks 6.20	21 October 2025	KDE Plasma 6.5	14 August 2025	KDE Gear 25.08
12 December 2025	KDE Frameworks 6.21	21 October 2025	KDE Plasma 6.5	11 December 2025	KDE Gear 25.12
9 January 2026	KDE Frameworks 6.22	21 October 2025	KDE Plasma 6.5	11 December 2025	KDE Gear 25.12
13 February 2026	KDE Frameworks 6.23	17 February 2026	KDE Plasma 6.6	11 December 2025	KDE Gear 25.12
13 March 2026	KDE Frameworks 6.24	17 February 2026	KDE Plasma 6.6	11 December 2025	KDE Gear 25.12
10 April 2026	KDE Frameworks 6.25	17 February 2026	KDE Plasma 6.6	16 April 2026	KDE Gear 26.04
8 May 2026	KDE Frameworks 6.26	17 February 2026	KDE Plasma 6.6	16 April 2026	KDE Gear 26.04
11 June 2026	KDE Frameworks 6.27	16 June 2026	KDE Plasma 6.7	16 April 2026	KDE Gear 26.04
10 July 2026	KDE Frameworks 6.28	16 June 2026	KDE Plasma 6.7	16 April 2026	KDE Gear 26.04
14 August 2026	KDE Frameworks 6.29	16 June 2026	KDE Plasma 6.7	20 August 2026	KDE Gear 26.08
9 September 2026	KDE Frameworks 6.30	16 June 2026	KDE Plasma 6.7	20 August 2026	KDE Gear 26.08
9 October 2026	KDE Frameworks 6.31	14 October 2026	KDE Plasma 6.8	20 August 2026	KDE Gear 26.08

The KDE team releases new versions on a regular basis.

=== Lines of Code ===
- KDE 1.0 had 800,000 LoC.
- KDE 4.3 had 4,200,000 LoC.

== Implementation ==
Most KDE software uses Qt which runs on most Unix and Unix-like systems (including Mac OS X), Android and Microsoft Windows. As of 2011 CMake serves as the build tool. This allows KDE to support a wider range of platforms, including Windows. GNU gettext is used for translation. Doxygen is used to generate api documentation.

=== Overview ===
- KDE Software Compilation: KDE Software Compilation (KDE SC) is the coordinated releases of new software versions, gathering elements from the previous components to build an integrated core of software. The KDE SC is not a product as a single entity.
- Calligra Suite: Integrated office suite.
- Kdewebdev: Web development tools.
- KDE-Extragear: Extragear is a collection of applications associated with KDE. Those applications are not part the official software compilation, but they are still part of the project.
- KDE-Playground: This package contains pre-release and unstable software. It is a place for applications to mature.

=== Packages ===
Default login sound of KDE SC

The Software Compilation consists of the following packages:

- KDE-Libs: A collection of libraries that provides frameworks and functionality for developers.
- KDE-Base: The base set of files, libraries and programs needed by the Software Compilation. KDE-Base is divided into three parts:
  - Applications: Containing the applications that form the KDE desktop, like Konqueror, Dolphin, KWrite, and Konsole.
  - Runtime: Applications required by KDE apps to function properly at runtime.
  - Workspace: Provides the graphical environments.
- KDE-Plasma-Addons: Additional Plasma widgets.
- KDE-Network
- KDE-Pim
- KDE-Graphics
- KDE-Multimedia
- Phonon
- KDE-Accessibility: Accessibility applications.
- KDE-Utilities
- KDE-Edu
- KDE-Games
- KDE-Toys
- KDE-Artwork: Additional icons, styles, etc.
- KDE-Admin
- KDE-SDK
- KDE-Bindings

=== Base technologies ===
- KHTML – HTML rendering engine, forked into WebKit in 2004
- KJS – JavaScript engine
- KIO – Extensible network-transparent file access
- Kiosk – Allows disabling features within KDE to create a more controlled environment
- KParts – Lightweight in-process graphical component framework
- KWin – Window manager
- XMLGUI – Allows defining UI elements, such as menus and toolbars via XML files
- Phonon – Multimedia framework
- Plasma – Desktop and panel widget engine
- Solid – Device integration framework
- Sonnet – Spell checker
- ThreadWeaver – Library to use multiprocessor systems more effectively

=== Applications ===
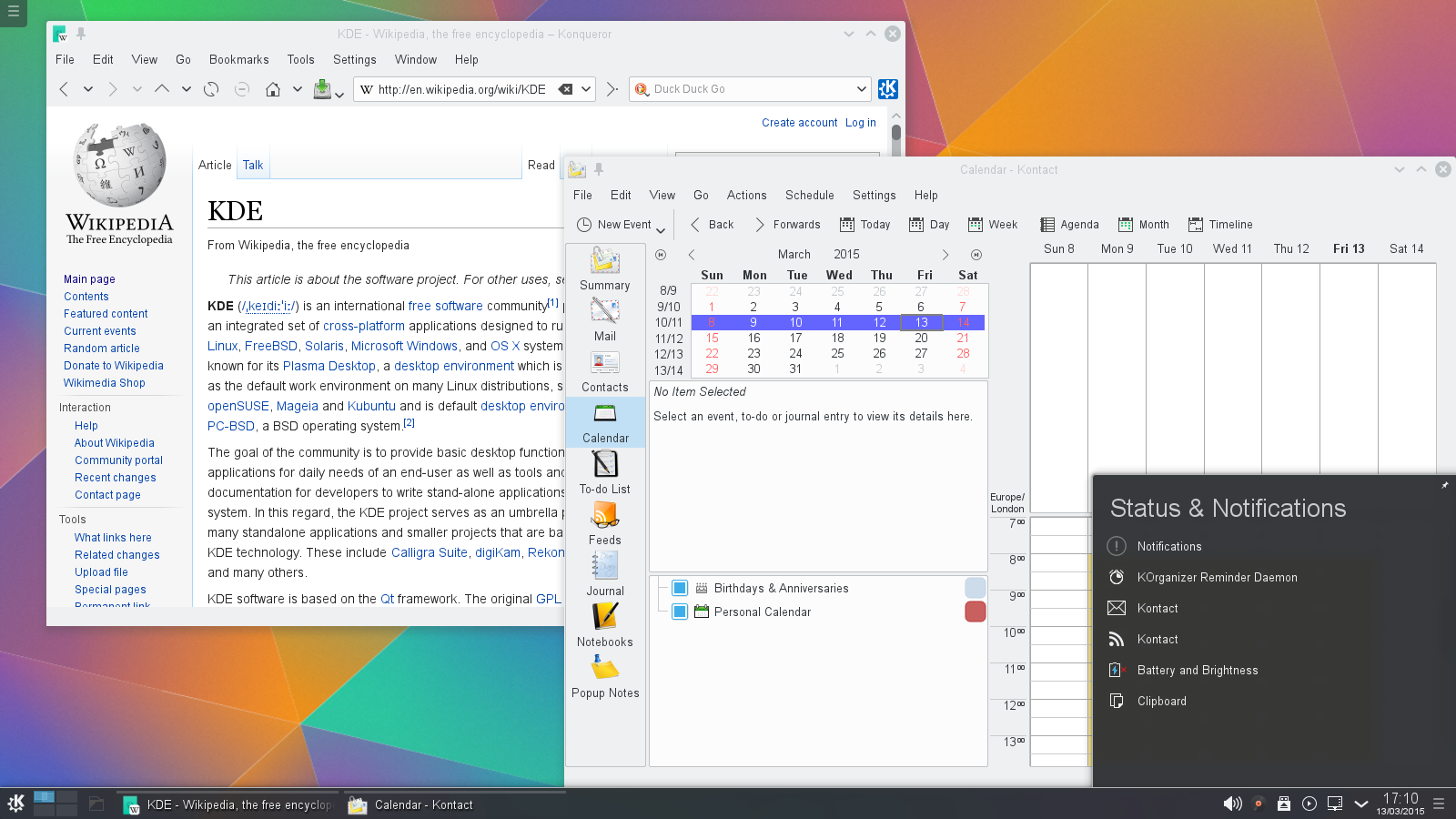
The Kontact personal information manager and Konqueror file manager/web browser running on KDE Plasma 5.2

Major applications by KDE Software Compilation include:

- Ark – Archiving tool
- Dragon Player – Media player.
- Dolphin – File manager
- Falkon – Web browser
- Gwenview – Image viewer
- Kate / KWrite – Text editor
- Konsole – Terminal emulator
- Kontact – Personal information manager featuring an e-mail client, a news client, a feed aggregator, to-do lists, etc.
- Konqueror – Web browser and file manager
- Kopete – Instant messaging client
- KRDC – a remote desktop client. Both the Virtual Network Computing (VNC) and Remote Desktop Protocol (RDP) protocols are supported, so Unix-like and Windows PC can be accessed using this software. As part of the GSoC, project developers helped make Libvncserver compile on Windows platforms, allowing for a port to Windows.

== Licensing ==
In November 1998, the Qt framework was dual-licensed under the free and open-source Q Public License (QPL) and a commercial license for proprietary software developers. The same year, the KDE Free Qt foundation was created which guarantees that Qt would fall under a variant of the very liberal BSD license should Trolltech cease to exist or no free version of Qt be released during 12 months.

Debate continued about compatibility with the GNU General Public License (GPL), hence in September 2000 Trolltech made the Unix version of the Qt libraries available under the GPL in addition to the QPL which eliminated the concerns of the Free Software Foundation. Trolltech continued to require licenses for developing proprietary software with Qt. The core libraries of KDE are collectively licensed under the GNU LGPL but the only way for proprietary software to make use of them was to be developed under the terms of the Qt proprietary license.

Starting with Qt 4.5, Qt was also made available under the LGPL version 2.1, now allowing proprietary applications to legally use the open source Qt version.

== See also ==
- KDE Platform
- Comparison of X Window System desktop environments
