= UltraVNC =

Remote desktop software

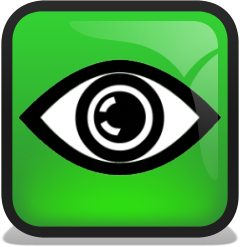

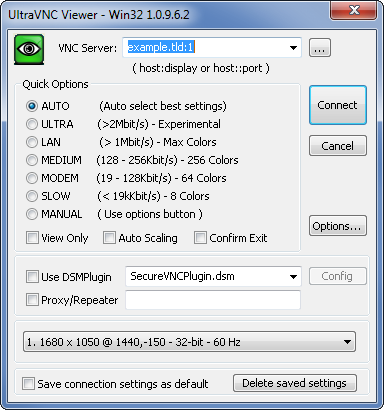
- Screenshot of UltraVNC Viewer connection dialog.
- Original authors: Rudi De Vos (Vdacc-VNC); UltraSam (eSVNC)
- Developers: Rudi De Vos; Ludovic Bocquet; Community
- Initial release: 5 December 2002; 23 years ago
- Stable release: 1.8.2.2 / 16 May 2026; 24 days ago
- Preview release: 1.8.1.1 / 1 May 2026; 39 days ago
- Written in: C, C++ and Java
- Operating system: Server: Windows; Client: Windows and Linux
- Platform: x86; x86-64
- Size: About 6 MB
- Standard: RFB/VNC
- Available in: Brazilian Portuguese; Catalan; English; French; German; Japanese; Russian; Spanish
- Type: Remote administration; Remote desktop software; Remote support; File transfer; software
- License: GPLv3
- Website: uvnc.com
- Repository: github.com/ultravnc/UltraVNC

UltraVNC (sometimes written uVNC) is an open-source remote-administration/remote-desktop-software utility.

The client supports Microsoft Windows and Linux but the server only supports Windows. It uses the RFB (VNC) protocol to allow a computer to access and control another one remotely over a network connection.

UltraVNC is a commonly used remote-access program, and has been in development since 2002, the most recent stable release being from 2026. The 1.5x development branch had more than 2 million views and downloads.

== Features ==
UltraVNC allows the use of a remote computer as if the user were in front of it. This is achieved by sending mouse movements and key-presses to the remote computer, and replicating the remote computer's display (subject to differences in resolution) locally in real time. UltraVNC bears a strong resemblance to RealVNC Free Edition. However, in addition to remote control, it adds various features, such as an encryption plugin to secure the client/server connection. It also supports file transfers, chat functionality and various authentication methods. The two computers must be able to communicate across a network, such as a local subnet, internal network, or the Internet. The software is free and distributed under the terms of the GNU General Public License version 3.

UltraVNC is developed in the C, C++, and Java programming languages.

It can use an optional mirror driver installed on the remotely controlled computer for fast and efficient notification of screen changes with very low CPU load, although this is not needed since later versions of Windows 10.

== History ==
UltraVNC is the result of the merger of Vdacc-VNC started by Rudi De Vos in 1999 and eSVNC started by Sam in 2002.

Since release 1.0.6.4, UltraVNC server can work as a Windows service under User Account Control (UAC).

== Reverse control ==
UltraVNC is notable as the base for free no-install remote help desk options including UltraVNC SC (Single Click) and PcHelpWare. These operate by generating pre-configured executables that can be downloaded and run on systems needing support; these applications then connect back to server software running on the system providing support.

== See also ==
- Comparison of remote desktop software
- File transfer
- Remote support
