= Andy Harter =

British computer scientist (born 1961)

Andy Harter CBE DL FREng CEng FIET FBCS CITP FRSA
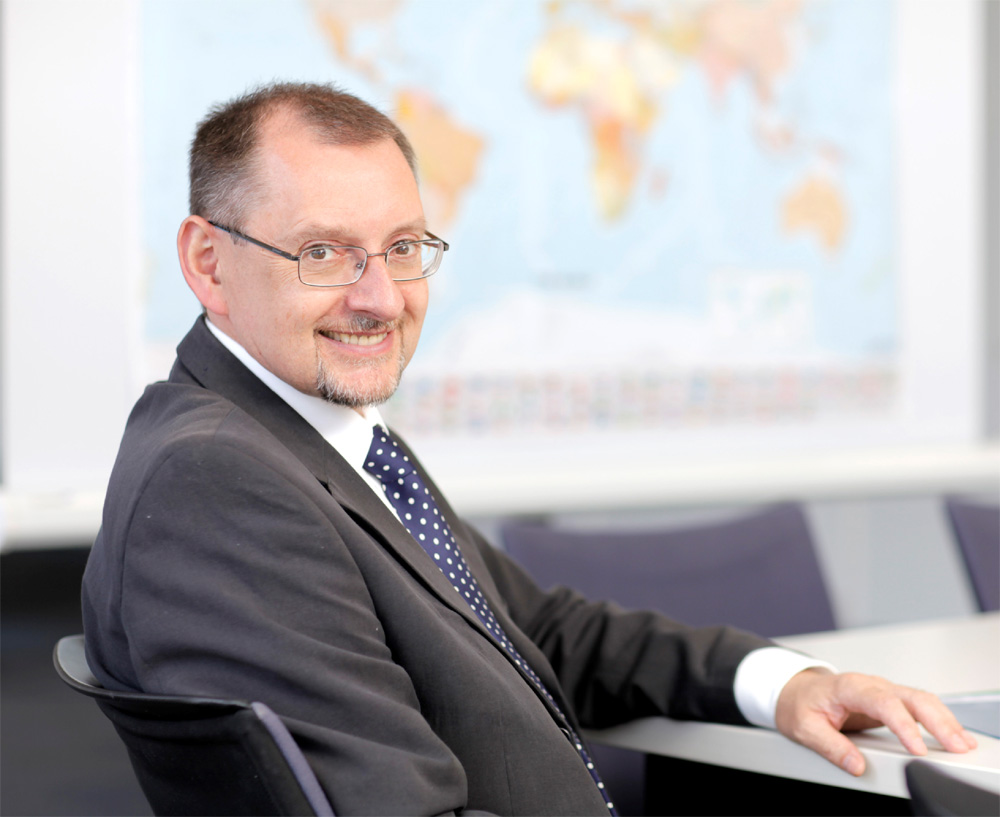
- Born: Andrew Charles Harter; 5 April 1961 (age 65); Yorkshire, England
- Education: Queen Elizabeth Grammar School, Wakefield; University of Cambridge (MA PhD)
- Known for: Virtual Network Computing
- Awards: Turing Lecture (2018); Faraday Medal (2016); MacRobert Award (2013); Silver Medal (2010)
- Scientific career
- Fields: Computer Science; Software Engineering
- Workplaces: University of Cambridge; RealVNC
- Thesis: Three-Dimensional Integrated Circuit Layout (1990)
- Doctoral advisor: Andy Hopper

Andrew Charles Harter (born 5 April 1961 in Yorkshire, England) is a British computer scientist, best known as the founder of RealVNC, where he was CEO until March 2018. He is also known for developing Virtual Network Computing (VNC), a remote access technology.

== Education and early life ==
Born in Yorkshire in 1961, Harter attended the Queen Elizabeth Grammar School, Wakefield. He went on to the University of Cambridge, where he studied Mathematics and Computer Science as an undergraduate student of Fitzwilliam College, Cambridge and a postgraduate student of Corpus Christi College, Cambridge. His doctoral thesis, supervised by Andy Hopper, was judged the best UK Computer Science dissertation of 1990.

== Career and research ==
Harter is probably best known for Virtual Network Computing (VNC), a ubiquitous remote access technology he developed in the mid 90s. He founded RealVNC in 2002 and was its chief executive until March 2018. In prior years he worked on embedding the technology in Google and Intel products. Under his leadership, in 2013 the company received its third Queen's Awards for Enterprise in three years and he was named the Cambridge Businessman of the Year in 2011. Harter was elected a Fellow of St Edmund's College, Cambridge in 2001 and appointed a visiting fellow at the University of Cambridge Computer Laboratory in 2002.

=== Awards and honours ===
In 2002 he was elected a Fellow of the Institution of Engineering and Technology (FIET), where he served as a trustee between 2014 and 2017. In 2010 he was awarded the Silver Medal of the Royal Academy of Engineering in recognition of an outstanding and sustained contribution to software engineering and commercialisation and in 2013 he led the team that won the academy's prestigious MacRobert Award. In 2011 he was elected a Fellow of the Royal Academy of Engineering (FREng), where he served as a trustee between 2013 and 2016. In 2014 he was appointed Chair of the Cambridge Network and in 2015 he was awarded an Honorary Doctor of Science degree from Anglia Ruskin University and also became a trustee of The Centre for Computing History. In 2016 he was awarded the Faraday Medal, the most prestigious award of the IET.

Harter was appointed Commander of the Order of the British Empire (CBE) in the 2017 Birthday Honours for services to engineering. He delivered the Turing Lecture in February 2018, and in March 2018 became the High Sheriff of Cambridgeshire. In 2019, he was appointed a Deputy Lieutenant of Cambridgeshire.
