= KDE on Cygwin =

KDE on Cygwin is the port of K Desktop Environment 1, 2, and 3 and the corresponding versions of the Qt toolkit to the Windows Operating System by using Cygwin, a POSIX emulation layer.

KDE on Cygwin helps Windows computers to run applications originally created for Qt and KDE, by providing the applications with the necessary dependencies in a transparent manner.

The project is no longer being developed as since 2009 there exists a natively-compiled version of KDE SC 4 for Windows.

== History ==
The project was started by Ralf Habacker in May 2001. Its goal was to ensure compatibility of major programs that were originally only available by using a Linux distribution.

After cessation of active development of KDE on Cygwin, the efforts to provide the KDE environment on Windows continue with the KDE Windows Initiative.

== Ported Software ==
As with many emulation examples, not all the common KDE programs are guaranteed to work unmodified on KDE on Cygwin due to the complex interaction of all the libraries needed. The open-source nature of KDE and several of the programs running on it, allows some of these shortcomings to be found and circumvented.

The project has ported various Qt and KDE versions, and are considered of beta quality.

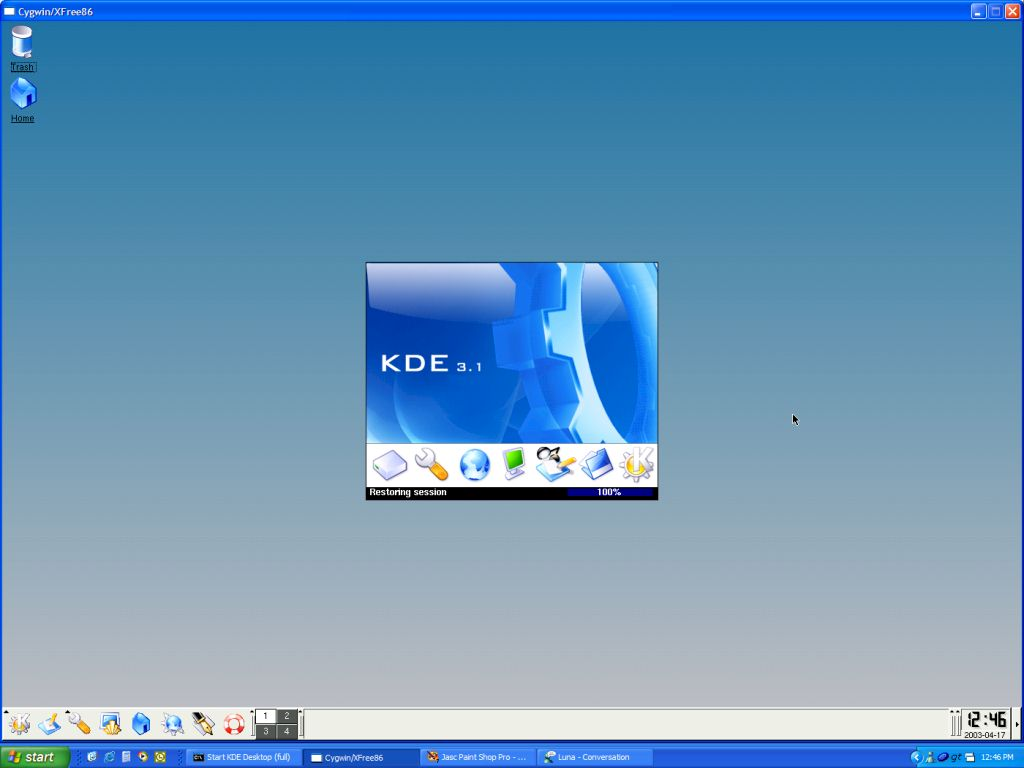
Kde starting up.

=== Qt ===
- 1.45
- 2.3.1
- 3.0.4
- 3.1.1
- 3.2.3

=== K Desktop Environment ===
- 1.45
- 2.2.2
- 3.1.1
- 3.1.4
