= Back to My Mac =

Former feature of macOS operating systems

Back to My Mac was a feature introduced with Mac OS X Leopard (10.5) . It makes it possible for a Mac user to remotely access a computer over an encrypted connection over the internet.

Due to its generality, Back to My Mac worked for many Bonjour-enabled services, not just Screen Sharing (similar to Apple Remote Desktop) and File Sharing. It required a router that supports either Universal Plug and Play (UPnP) or NAT Port Mapping Protocol (NAT-PMP). It used UDP port 4500 for point-to-point IPsec connections (which may be mapped to different UDP ports on the public side of a NAT router). It enable a local KDC service for secure Kerberos authentication.

For a time, Apple included Back to My Mac in its iCloud service rather than the previously used MobileMe, thus making it free to use.

On August 9, 2018, Apple updated a support document to note that Back to My Mac would not be part of the macOS Mojave (10.14) release. The support document was updated again on May 31, 2019, to indicate that Back to My Mac services would be discontinued for all other versions of macOS as of July 1, 2019.

== Uses ==
Back to My Mac was used to edit and transfer files from one Mac to another. In one instance an Apple Store employee used this technology to capture the image of a person who stole a MacBook, using the built in iSight webcam.
