= Apple Remote Desktop =

Application by Apple

- Developer: Apple Inc.
- Stable release: 3.9.9 / February 20, 2025
- Operating system: macOS Sonoma, macOS Sequoia
- Type: Remote Access Software
- License: Proprietary
- Website: www.apple.com/remotedesktop/

Apple Remote Desktop (ARD) is a Macintosh application produced by Apple Inc., first released on March 14, 2002, that replaced a similar product called Apple Network Assistant. Aimed at computer administrators responsible for large numbers of computers and teachers who need to assist individuals or perform group demonstrations, Apple Remote Desktop allows users to remotely control or monitor other computers over a network. Mac Pro (2019), Mac mini (M1, 2020) with a 10Gb Ethernet card, and Mac Studio (2022) have Lights Out Management function and are able to power-on by Apple Remote Desktop.

== Releases ==
The original release, which used the User Datagram Protocol (UDP) on port 3283, allowed remote computers (running Mac OS 8.1 or later) to be observed or controlled from a computer running Mac OS X 10.1. It also allowed remote computers to be restarted or shut down, to have their screens locked or unlocked, or be put to sleep or awakened, all remotely. Version 1 also included simple file transfer abilities that would allow administrators to install simple applications remotely; however, to install applications that required the use of an installer, the administrator would have to run the installer manually through the client system's interface.

Version 1.1 (released August 20, 2002) introduced the ability to schedule remote tasks.

Version 1.2 (released April 2, 2003) added a number of features that were designed to ease the administration of a large number of computers. Software could now be installed remotely on a number of machines simultaneously, without using the client system's interface. The startup disk on remote computers can also be changed, setting them to boot from a NetBoot server, a Network Install image, or a partition on their own drives. The client ARD software could also now be upgraded remotely to allow administrators to take advantage of new features without having to visit each individual computer.

Apple released a minor update on December 16, 2003, that brought ARD to 1.2.4. This update concentrated on security, performance and reliability.

On June 21, 2004, Apple announced Apple Remote Desktop 2 (released in July), which was designed to use the VNC protocol (Note: Apple uses its private authentication and encodings on top of the public RFB protocol while neglecting to implement many of the commonly-used public extensions. As a result, other VNC-compatible clients need extra server-side configuration to connect at all. In addition, the graphics are degraded as primitive encodings are used for such connections.) instead of Apple's original ARD protocol. This allows the ARD administration software to observe and control any computer running VNC-compatible server software (such as Windows and Unix systems) not just Macs and conversely allowing standard VNC viewing software to connect to any Mac with the ARD 2 software installed and VNC access enabled. This version also uses the Transmission Control Protocol (TCP) for most functions (on ports 5900 and 5988), which is designed to be more reliable than the UDP used in ARD 1. Another significant addition to ARD 2 was the Task List, that allows remote tasks to be queued and monitored, reporting their status (such as Succeeded or Failed). This release also dropped support for older versions of the Mac OS, requiring 10.2.8 or higher.

On October 11, 2004, Apple released version 2.1 which improved on a number of existing features while adding the ability to view observed or controlled computers in full-screen mode, the ability to see the displays of computers with more than one monitor and support for mouse right-click and scroll wheels.

On April 29, 2005, Apple released version 2.2 which added support for Mac OS X 10.4 along with several other bug fixes and improvements to reliability.

On April 11, 2006, Apple released version 3.0, a PowerPC-Intel Universal Binary featuring improved software upgrade functionality, Spotlight searching, increased throughput and encryption for file transfers, and Automator support.

On November 16, 2006, Apple released version 3.1 which provides support for the new Intel-based Xserve Lights Out Management feature.

On October 18, 2007, Apple released version 3.2 which introduced Mac OS X 10.5 support and compatibility for third-party VNC viewers and servers.

On August 20, 2009, Apple released version 3.3 which fixed many bugs and allowed function keys and key combinations to be sent to the remote computer instead of the local machine.

On January 6, 2011, Apple released version 3.4 which provides compatibility with the Mac App Store.

On July 20, 2011, Apple released version 3.5 which provides compatibility with Mac OS X 10.7.

On October 22, 2013, Apple released version 3.7 which provides compatibility with OS X 10.9, multiple monitors, and enhancements to remote copy/paste.

On January 27, 2015, Apple released version 3.8, which primarily added support for OS X 10.10, while also including various user interface improvements, a new icon, stability improvements and the ability to update the application using the Mac App Store, even if the application was not originally installed from that source. This version now requires OS X 10.9 or later.

On February 21, 2017, Apple released version 3.9, which heightened communications security between local and remote computers (including a Preferences checkbox to allow communication with pre-3.9 clients), added support for the MacBook Pro Touch Bar, addressed various stability issues, allowed the user to export and import an encrypted list of computers with user credentials, and debuted the ability to use an "Assistance Cursor" to call attention to items for the remote user. This version now requires OS X 10.10.5 or later.

Starting on October 7, 2019, the next several updates to version 3.9.x would introduce minor user interface and performance improvements and bug fixes. Compatibility was added for Macs with Apple Silicon processors with an Intel-Apple Silicon Universal Binary 2 in version 3.9.4, and for macOS versions up to macOS Sequoia. Version 3.9.9 requires macOS Sonoma 14.5 or later.

On October 8, 2025, Apple released version 3.10, which introduced macOS Tahoe 26 compatibility, provided Tahoe-specific features such as the Accessibility and Remote Keyboard menu and toolbar items and VoiceOver support for remote Macs, along with bug fixes and performance improvements. Version 3.10 requires macOS Sequoia 15.5 or later.

== Encryption ==
Prior to version 3, ARD encrypted only passwords, mouse events and keystrokes, and not desktop graphics or file transfers. Apple therefore recommended that ARD traffic crossing a public network should be tunneled through a VPN, to avoid the possibility of someone eavesdropping on ARD sessions.

ARD 3.0 has the option of using AES 128-bit encryption, the same as a basic SSH server.

ARD 3.9 included as yet unspecified enhancements to communications security that made the native mode incompatible with previous-version clients. A Preferences checkbox was provided in the Apple Remote Desktop app to explicitly allow communications with older clients. ARD 3.9.2 made the use of this checkbox optional for seeing clients in the list.

== Legal ==
In November 2017, the United States International Trade Commission announced an investigation into allegations of patent infringement with regard to Apple's remote desktop technology. Aqua Connect, a company that builds remote desktop software, has claimed that Apple infringed on two of its patents.

== See also ==
- Comparison of remote desktop software
- Remote Desktop Services
- RFB (protocol)
- VNC
