= K Desktop Environment 1 =

1998 free software

- K Desktop Environment 1.0
- Developer: KDE
- Release: 12 July 1998; 28 years ago
- Final release: 1.1.2 / 13 September 1999; 27 years ago
- Written in: C++
- Operating system: Unix-like with X11
- Platform: Qt 1
- Successor: K Desktop Environment 2
- Available in: Multiple languages
- Type: Desktop environment
- License: GNU GPL
- Website: kde.org
- Repository: invent.kde.org/historical/kde1

K Desktop Environment 1 was the inaugural series of releases of the K Desktop Environment. There were two major releases in this series.

== Pre-release ==
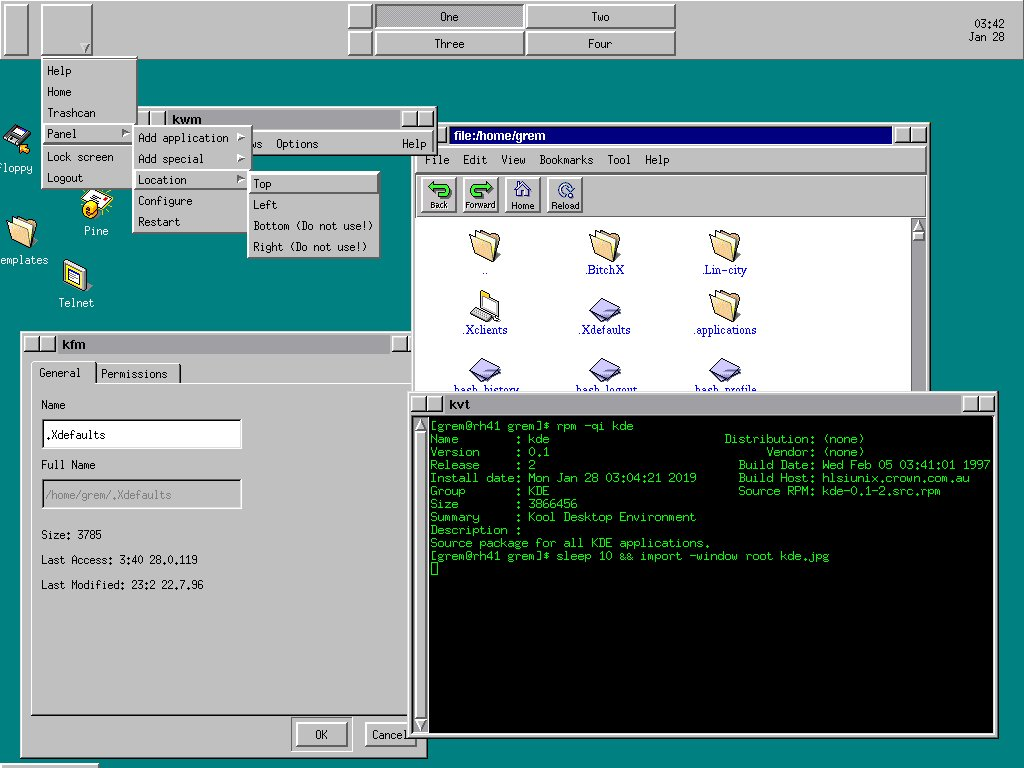
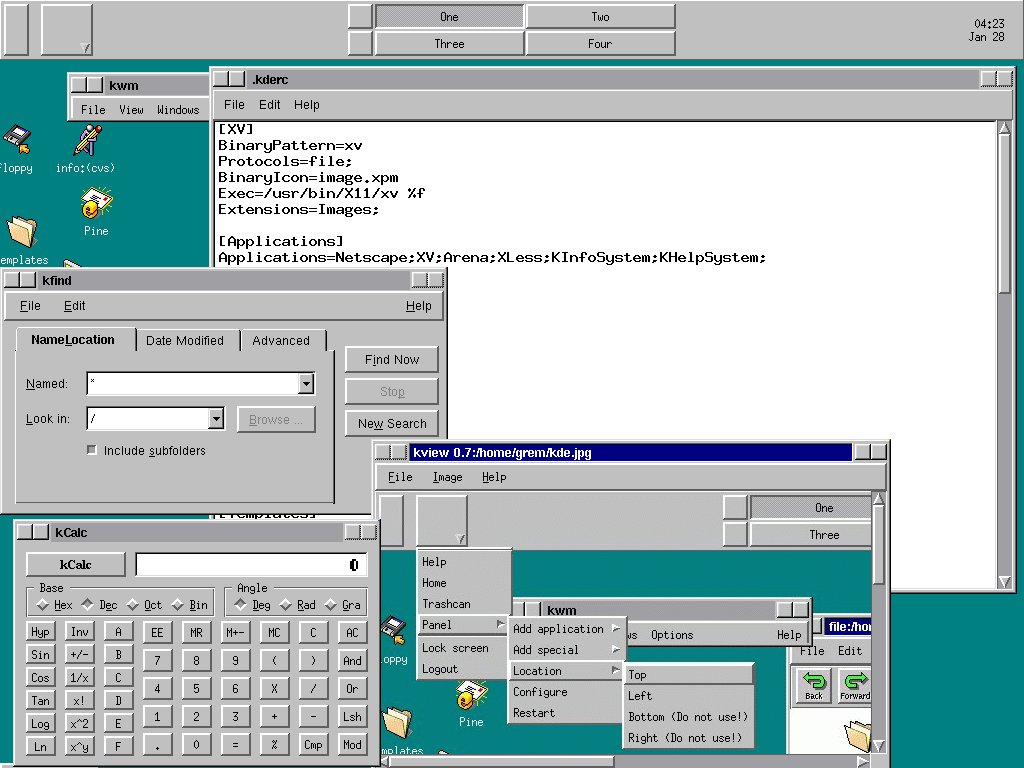
K Desktop Environment, version 0.1 from February 1997

The development started right after Matthias Ettrich's announcement on 14th October 1996 to found the Kool Desktop Environment. The word Kool was dropped shortly afterward and the name became simply K Desktop Environment.

In the beginning, all components were released to the developer community separately without any coordinated timeframe throughout the overall project. First communication of KDE via mailing list, that was called kde@fiwi02.wiwi.uni-Tubingen.de.

The first coordinated release was Beta 1 on 20 October 1997 – almost exactly one year after the original announcement. Three additional Betas followed 23 November 1997, 1 February 1998, and 19 April 1998.

== K Desktop Environment 1.0 ==
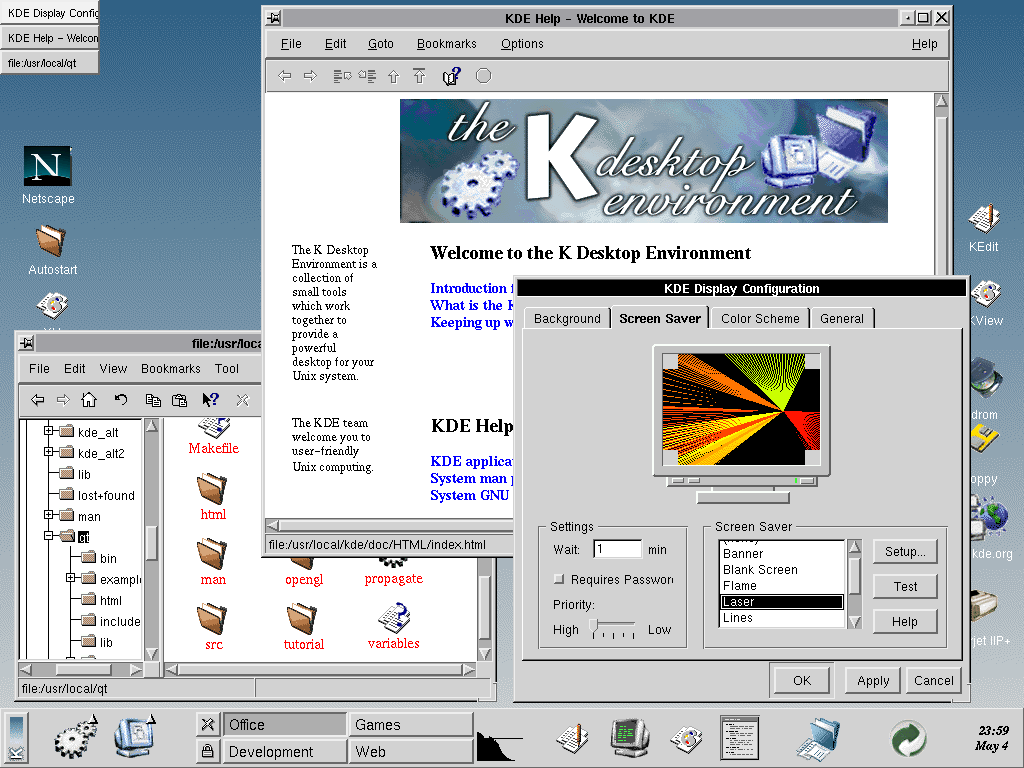
K Desktop Environment,
alpha version from July 1997

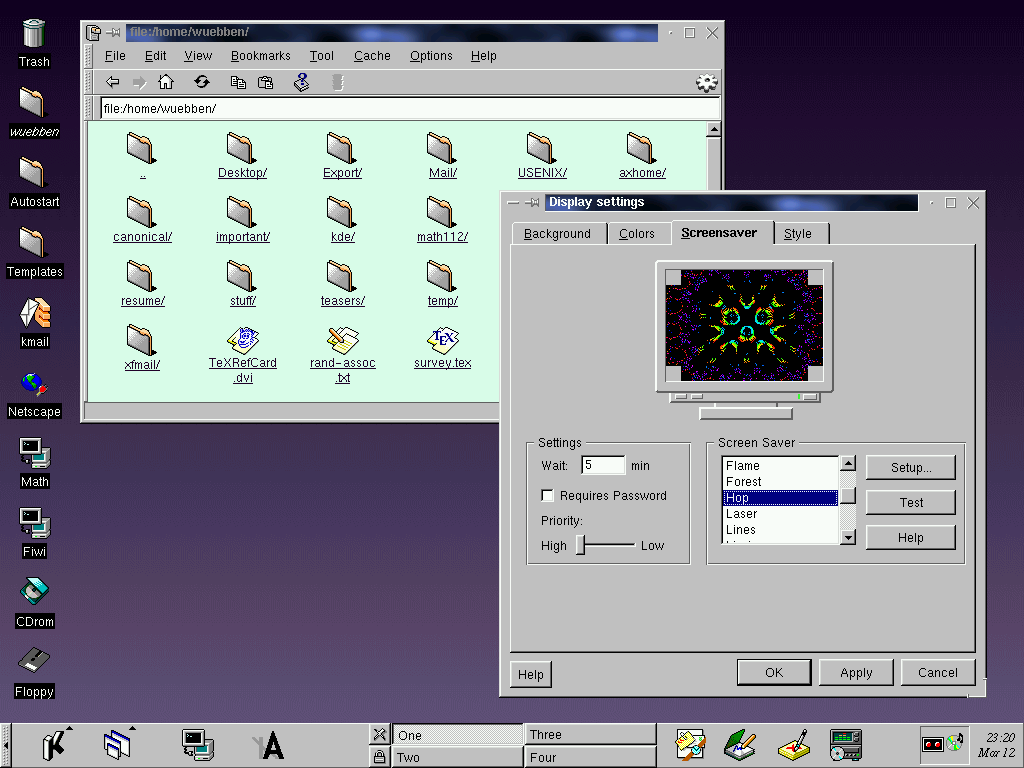
K Desktop Environment Beta 3

Release schedule
Date	Event
1.0
20 October 1997	KDE Beta 1 released
12 July 1998	KDE 1.0 released
1.1
4 March 1999	KDE 1.1 released
3 May 1999	1.1.1 Maintenance release
13 September 1999	1.1.2 Maintenance release
14 October 2016	20th anniversary re-release

On 12 July 1998 the finished version 1.0 of K Desktop Environments was released:

KDE is a network transparent, contemporary desktop environment for UNIX workstations. KDE seeks to fill the need for an easy to use desktop for Unix workstations, similar to the desktop environments found under the MacOS or Window95/NT [sic]. We believe that the UNIX operating system is the best operating system available today. In fact UNIX has been the undisputed choice of the information technology professional for many years. When it comes to stability, scalability and openness there is no competition to UNIX. However, the lack of an easy to use contemporary desktop environment for UNIX has prevented UNIX from finding its way onto the desktops of the typical computer user in offices and homes. With KDE there is now an easy to use, contemporary desktop environment available for UNIX. Together with a free implementation of UNIX such as Linux, UNIX/KDE constitutes a completely free and open computing platform available to anyone free of charge including its source code for anyone to modify. While there will always be room for improvement we believe to have delivered a viable alternative to some of the more commonly found and commercial operating systems/desktops combinations available today. It is our hope that the combination UNIX/KDE will finally bring open, reliable, stable and monopoly free computing to the average computer.

— KDE 1.0 Release Announcement

This version received mixed reception. Many criticized the use of the Qt software framework – back then under the Qt Free Edition License which was claimed to not be compatible with free software – and advised the use of Motif or LessTif instead. Despite that criticism, KDE was well received by many users and made its way into the first Linux distributions.

== K Desktop Environment 1.1 ==
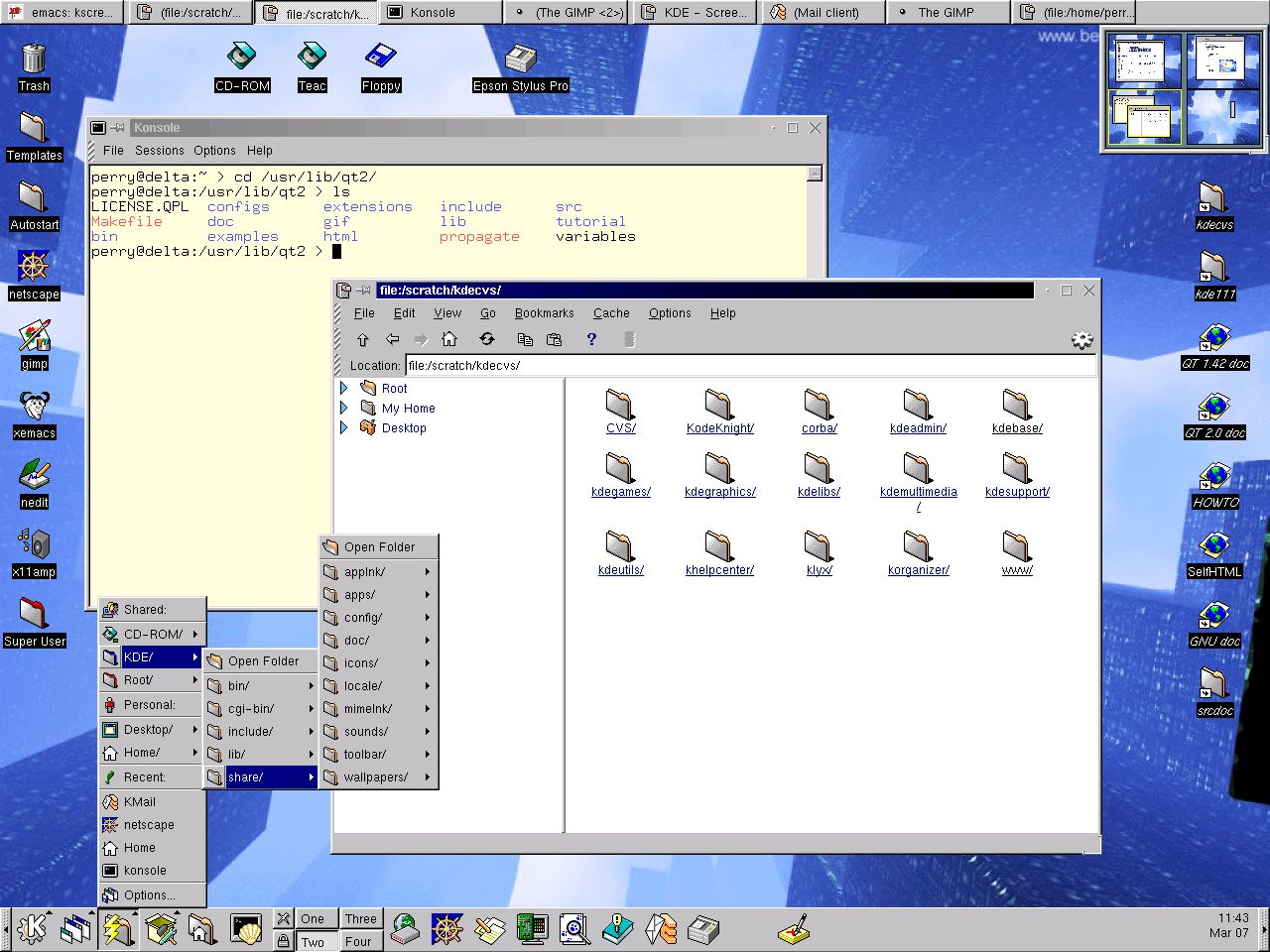
K Desktop Environment 1.1

An update, K Desktop Environment 1.1, was faster, more stable and included many small improvements. It also included a new set of icons, backgrounds and textures. Among this overhauled artwork was a new KDE logo by Torsten Rahn consisting of the letter K in front of a gear which is used in revised form to this day.

Some components received more far-reaching updates, such as the Konqueror predecessor kfm, the application launcher kpanel, and the KWin predecessor kwm. Newly introduced were e. g. kab, a software library for address management, and a rewrite of KMail, called kmail2, which was installed as alpha version in parallel to the classic KMail version. kmail2, however, never left alpha state and development was ended in favor of updating classic KMail.

K Desktop Environment 1.1 was well received among critics.

At the same time Trolltech prepared version 2.0 of Qt which was released as beta on 1999-01-28. Consequently, no bigger upgrades for KDE 1 based on Qt 1 were developed. Instead only bugfixes were released: version 1.1.1 on 1999-05-03 and version 1.1.2 on 1999-09-13.

A more profound upgrade along with a port to Qt 2 was in development as K Desktop Environment 2.

=== KDE Restoration Project ===
To celebrate KDE's 20th birthday, KDE and Fedora contributor Helio Chissini de Castro re-released 1.1.2 on 2016-10-14.

That re-release incorporates several changes required for compatibility with modern Linux variants. Work on that project started one month earlier at QtCon, a conference for Qt developers, in Berlin. There Castro showcased Qt 1.45 compiling on a modern Linux system.

== See also ==
- Linux on the desktop
