= LibVNCServer =

LibVNCServer/LibVNCClient
- Original author: Johannes Schindelin et al.
- Stable release: 0.9.14 / December 19, 2022; 3 years ago
- Written in: C
- Operating system: Cross-platform
- Type: Remote desktop software / VNC
- License: GPLv2
- Website: libvnc.github.io
- Repository: github.com/LibVNC/libvncserver

In computer networking, LibVNCServer and LibVNCClient are cross-platform C libraries for the VNC server and client implementations. Both libraries support version 3.8 of the Remote Framebuffer (RFB) protocol, are fully IPv6-conformant and can handle most known VNC encodings. LibVNCClient also supports encrypted connections. Both libraries are GPL-licensed and portable to many different operating systems.

== See also ==
- x11vnc
