= LanSchool =

Classroom management software

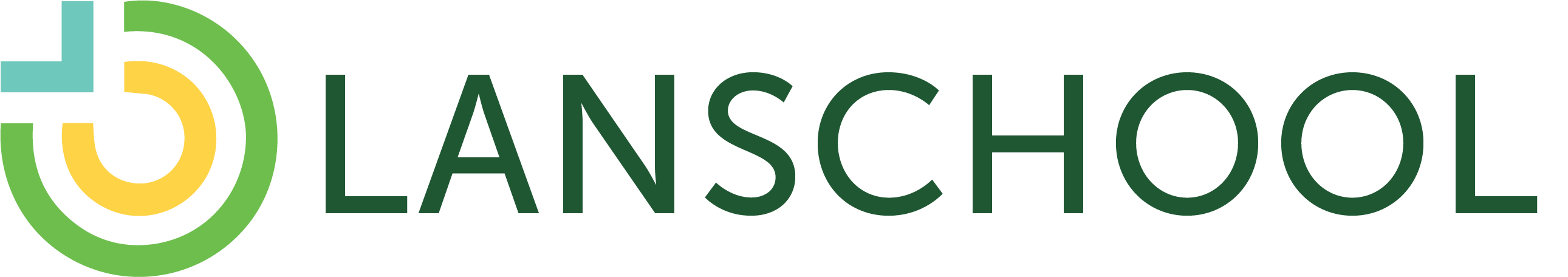
- Developer: Lenovo Software
- Release: February 9, 1986; 40 years ago (as LanFan Technologies); April 2001 (as LanSchool Technologies, LLC)
- Platform: Windows, macOS, ChromeOS, iOS, and Android
- Type: Classroom management
- License: Proprietary
- Website: www.lanschool.com

LanSchool is a classroom management software owned by Lenovo focused on school environments. The company is based in Research Triangle Park, North Carolina. It was founded as LanFan Technologies in February 1986. Two versions of the software are available: LanSchool Classic, the locally hosted version, and LanSchool Air, the cloud-based version. Both versions enable teachers to monitor students’ screens while in class, limit the websites students may visit, as well as “push” websites and messages to classroom devices.

== Technology ==
LanSchool's software uses a proprietary remote desktop protocol that communicates over a local area network. An application is installed on the teacher's computer, which communicates peer-to-peer with a software agent running on pupils' computers.

== History ==
Originally named LanFan Technologies, the company was founded in February 1986 by Dana Doggett. Doggett began exploring the concept of a software application that would allow an instructor to control multiple computers.

Doggett developed a software tool called PC Chalkboard that was then implemented by Novell. PC Chalkboard allowed Novell lab instructors to broadcast their screens to each PC in the lab. LanSchool was licensed by both Intel and IBM and actively marketed through each company's education sales channel. In April 2001, Doggett left Intel and formed another company, LanSchool Technologies, LLC, where he could work on LanSchool full-time.

== Acquisitions ==
LanSchool was acquired by Stoneware in 2011. In September 2012, Lenovo announced the acquisition of Stoneware which was completed on December 26, 2012.

== Security ==
There have been cases of students being able to exploit the LanSchool software to bypass restrictions, and in some cases take control of other students' computers. A 2006 post on CompSci.ca details the packet structure of older versions of the software, and claims there was no encryption or similar precautions. This issue was confirmed to have been caught and fixed in the following year.

== Features ==
The program has multiple features, including thumbnail view, whitelisting and blacklisting websites, keystroke monitoring and screen broadcasting. The program also allows the teacher to access the camera, microphone, and internet history.

== See also ==
- Employee monitoring software
- Computer surveillance
- Computer Lab
