= RealVNC =

Software company

- Original author: Andy Harter
- Developer: RealVNC Ltd.
- Release: 2002; 24 years ago
- Stable release: VNC Server: 7.15.1; VNC Viewer: 7.15.1 / October 16, 2025; 11 months ago
- Written in: C++, Java
- Operating system: Windows; Linux; macOS; Android; iOS
- Platform: x86-64; M1–M2–M3 (macOS); ARM (Raspberry Pi)
- Type: remote access and administration software
- License: RealVNC: proprietary, VNC Open: GPL
- Website: www.realvnc.com

RealVNC is a company that provides remote access and administration software. Their VNC Connect software consists of a server (VNC Server) and client (VNC Viewer) application, in a client–server model, which exchange data over the RFB protocol to allow the Viewer to control the Server's screen remotely. The application is used, for example, by information technology (IT) technical support to provide help desk services to remote users.

== History ==
Andy Harter and other members of the original VNC team at AT&T founded RealVNC Limited in 2002. The automotive division of RealVNC spun out as a separate company (VNC Automotive) in 2018.

== Platforms, editions, versions ==
For a desktop-to-desktop connection RealVNC runs on Windows, macOS, and many Unix-like operating systems. A list of supported platforms can be found on the website. A RealVNC client also runs on the Java platform and on the Apple iPhone, iPod touch and iPad and Google Android devices.

A Windows-only client, VNC Viewer Plus was launched in 2010, designed to interface to the embedded server on Intel AMT chipsets found on Intel vPro motherboards. RealVNC removed VNC Viewer Plus from sale on 28th February 2021.

For remote access to view one computer desktop on another, RealVNC requires one of three subscriptions:

1. Home – free registration and activation required
2. Professional – commercial version for home or small-business users, with authentication and encryption, remote printing, chat and file transfer
3. Enterprise – commercial version for enterprises, with enhanced authentication and encryption, remote printing, chat, file transfer, and command-line deployment

As of release 4.3 in August 2007, separate versions of both the Personal and Enterprise editions exist for 32-bit and 64-bit systems. Release 4.6 included features such as HTTP proxy support, chat, an address book, remote printing, Unicode support, and connection notification.

Users must activate each of the server versions: Home, Professional, and Enterprise.

With release 5.0 in late December 2013, RealVNC software editions used one binary which superseded VNC Enterprise Edition and VNC Personal Edition.

In November 2016, RealVNC released the updated version of their software, renamed VNC Connect (version 6.0). It introduces a cloud connection option using a subscription-based pricing model. Users can choose between three subscription levels; Home (free for non-commercial use), Professional, and Enterprise. Home and Professional subscriptions are cloud connections only. The Enterprise subscription supports hybrid connections that include the traditional direct (peer to peer) connections and/or cloud connections.

== Client (VNC Viewer) ==
RealVNC clients using vncviewer can run in full-screen mode; they use the F8 function-key as the default key for bringing up an options menu (which includes the option to, among other things, switch off full screen mode or to forward a Control-Alt-Delete key-sequence).

== Server (VNC Server) ==
The server component of RealVNC allows a computer to be remotely controlled by another computer.

== Connectivity ==
RealVNC uses the RFB protocol. RFB 6.0 defaults to TCP/UDP port 5900. When making a connection over the Internet, a user must open this port in the local firewall and configure port forwarding to forward TCP Port 5900 (or the customized port respectively) to the local machine address if behind a network address translation (NAT) router.

Alternately, one can tunnel VNC through Secure Shell (SSH), avoiding the opening of more ports and automatically traversing the NAT router. SSH also provides encryption of the connection between the VNC server and viewer.

After proposing remote access interface for Weston in October 2013, RealVNC published a Wayland developer preview in July 2014.

== Limits ==
The Virtual Network Computing (VNC) protocol is pixel-based. Although this leads to great flexibility (e.g., any type of desktop can be displayed), it is often less efficient than solutions that have a better understanding of the underlying graphic layout, like X11. Those protocols send graphic primitives or high-level commands in a simpler form (e.g., open window), whereas RFB just sends the raw pixel data.
