= Matthias Ettrich =

German programmer, founder of the KDE project

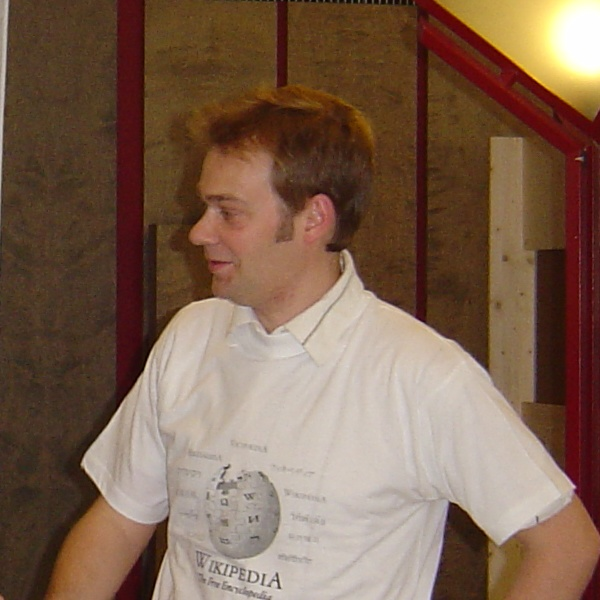
- Matthias Ettrich at LinuxTag, 23 May 2005
- Born: 14 June 1972 (age 53); Bietigheim-Bissingen, Baden-Württemberg, West Germany
- Occupation: Software engineer
- Employer: Here
- Known for: KDE and LyX

Matthias Ettrich (born 14 June 1972) is a German computer scientist and founder of the KDE and LyX projects.

== Early life ==
Ettrich was born in Bietigheim-Bissingen, Baden-Württemberg, West Germany, and went to school in Beilstein while living with his parents in Oberstenfeld. He passed the Abitur in 1991. Ettrich studied for his MSc in Computer Science at the Wilhelm Schickard Institute for Computer Science at the University of Tübingen.

== Career ==
He currently resides in Berlin, Germany. He is currently focused on advising start-ups and corporations on digital transformation and in sound technical decision-making.

== Free software projects ==
Ettrich founded and furthered the LyX project in 1995, initially conceived as a university term project. LyX is a graphical frontend to LaTeX.

Since LyX's main target platform was Linux, he started exploring different ways to improve the graphical user interface, ultimately leading him to the KDE project. Ettrich founded KDE in 1996 when he proposed on Usenet a "consistent, nice looking free desktop environment" [sic] for Unix-like systems using Qt as its widget toolkit.

On 6 November 2009, Ettrich was decorated with the Federal Cross of Merit for his contributions to free software.
