= Comparison of remote desktop software =

This page is a comparison of notable remote desktop software available for various platforms.

== Remote desktop software ==
Software	Protocols	Creator	First public release date	Latest stable year, version	License	Free for personal use	Free for commercial use
AetherPal	Proprietary	AetherPal Inc.	2011	2016, Valet	Proprietary	No	No
Ammyy Admin	Proprietary	Ammyy Inc.	2007	2015, 3.5	Proprietary	Yes	No
AnyDesk	Proprietary	AnyDesk Software GmbH	2015	2025-05-7, 9.7.3	Proprietary	Yes	No
Anyplace Control	Proprietary	Anyplace Control Software	2002	2012, 5.4.0.0	Proprietary	No	No
Apple Remote Desktop	RFB (VNC)	Apple	2002	2023, 3.9.8	Proprietary	No	No
Apple Screen Sharing (iChat)	Proprietary, RFB (VNC)	Apple	2007	2014, 1.6	Proprietary	Yes	Yes
AppliDis	RDP	Systancia	?	2013, 4 SP3	Proprietary	No	No
Cendio ThinLinc	RFB (VNC)	Cendio AB	2003	2026-08-21, 4.21.0	Proprietary	Yes (Note: Free use limited to 10 concurrent users.)	Yes
Chrome Remote Desktop	Chromoting	Google	2011	2025, 139.0.7258.8	BSD Client, Proprietary Server	Yes	Yes
Citrix XenApp/Presentation Server/MetaFrame/WinFrame	RDP, ICA	Citrix Systems	1995	2018-06-01, 7.18	Proprietary	No	No
Ericom Connect	Proprietary	Ericom Software	2015	2019, 9.1	Proprietary	No	No
GO-Global	Proprietary	GraphOn	?	?	Proprietary	No	No
Goverlan Systems Management (Goverlan Reach Remote Control)	Proprietary, RDP, RFB (VNC), Intel vPro KVM, SSH	Goverlan Systems Management	1998	2019, 9.01	Proprietary	No	No
GoToMyPC	Proprietary	Citrix Online	2000	2013	Proprietary	No	No
HP Remote Graphics Software (RGS) / ZCentral Remote Boost	HP RGS	HP Inc	2003	2022-05-01, 22.1	Proprietary	No (Note: Receiver is a free download Sender is free on HP Z Workstations.)	No
IBM Director Remote Control	Proprietary	IBM	?	?	Proprietary	No	No
I'm InTouch	Proprietary	Communique	2000	2015, 9.51	Proprietary	No	No
Krdc	RFB (VNC), RDP	Tim Jansen, Urs Wolfer, a.o.	2010	2021-03-04, 20.12.3 (Note: Since 2010 KRDC has been integrated with the KDE desktop manager.)	GPL-2.0-or-later	Yes	Yes
LogMeIn Resolve	Proprietary	GoTo	2023	2025-11-12	Proprietary	No	No
MeshCentral	WebRTC	Yilan Saint-Hilaire	2007	2026, 1.1.56	Apache-2.0	Yes	Yes
Mikogo	Proprietary	BeamYourScreen GmbH	?	2015-03-24, 5.2.2	Proprietary	Yes	No
NetSupport Manager	Proprietary	NetSupport Software	1989	2019	Proprietary	No	No
Netviewer	Proprietary	Netviewer AG	?	?	Proprietary	No	No
NX technology (NoMachine)	Proprietary	NoMachine	2003	2026-10-06, 10.2.3	Proprietary	No	No
Oracle Secure Global Desktop Software/Sun VDI	AIP	Tarantella/Oracle Inc.	1997	2015-04, 5.2.903	Proprietary	No	No
Parsec	Proprietary	Parsec Cloud, Inc	2016	2016-07, 3.5	Proprietary	Yes	No
Proxy Networks	Proprietary	Funk Software Inc.	1993	2020-01-29, 10.2	Proprietary	No	No
QVD	NX and HTTP	Qindel Group	2001	2020-10, 4.2	GPL	Yes	Yes
rdesktop	RDP	Matthew Chapman	2001	2019, 1.9.0	GPL-3.0-or-later	Yes	Yes
RealVNC VNC Server/Viewer	Proprietary, RFB (VNC), SSH	RealVNC	2002	2025-10-16, Server 7.15.1, Viewer 7.15.1	Proprietary	No	No
Remmina	RDP, RFB (VNC), SPICE, XDMCP, SSH, EXEC	Originally written by Vic Lee	2009	2025-01-05, 1.4.39	GPL-2.0-or-later	Yes	Yes
Remote Desktop Services/Terminal Services	RDP	Microsoft	1998	2016	Proprietary	Yes	Yes (Note: Admin mode available for servers & workstations without additional licensing, in TS mode a separate license is required.)
Remote Utilities	Proprietary	Alex Ter-Osipov, Remote Utilities LLC	2004	2019	Proprietary	Yes	No
RustDesk	Custom Rendezvous protocol	Purslane Ltd.	2020	2026-01-09, 1.4.5	AGPL-3.0-or-later	Yes	Yes
ScreenConnect	Proprietary	Elsinore Technologies	2008	2026, 26.2	Proprietary	Yes (Note: Single-technician license - 1 connection - 3 unattended access agents)	Yes
Splashtop	Proprietary	Splashtop Inc	2010	2026-01-19, 3.8.0.4	Proprietary	No	No
SSH with X forwarding	X11	?	1999	2015, OpenSSH: 7.1, protocol: 2.0	BSD	Yes	Yes
Sun Ray/SRSS	ALP	?	?	?	Proprietary	?	?
Symantec pcAnywhere	Proprietary	Symantec Corporation	1986	2012, 12.6.65	Proprietary	No	No
TeamViewer	Proprietary	TeamViewer GmbH	2005	2025, 15.70.3 (Windows), 15.70.4 (macOS & Linux)	Proprietary	Yes	No
Techinline	RDP	Techinline Ltd.	2006	2016, 4.2.2	Proprietary	No	No
TigerVNC	RFB (VNC)	Red Hat, Cendio AB, The VirtualGL Project	2009	2025-02-13, 1.15.0	GPL-2.0-or-later	Yes	Yes
TightVNC	RFB (VNC)	GlavSoft LLC, Constantin Kaplinsky	2001	2024-06-17, 2.8.85	GPL-2.0-or-later	Yes	Yes
Timbuktu	Proprietary	WOS Datasystems	pre-1988	2013, 8.8.5 (macOS)/9.0.5 (Windows)	Proprietary	Yes	Yes
TurboVNC	RFB (VNC)	The VirtualGL Project	2004	2026-08-20, 3.3.1	GPL	Yes	Yes
UltraVNC	RFB (VNC)	Rudi De Vos, Ludovic Bocquet	2002	November 5, 2026; 6 days ago, 1.8.3.2	GPLv3	Yes	Yes
Veyon	RFB (VNC)	?	2005	2021-03-11, 4.5.4	GPL-2.0-or-later	Yes	Yes
Vinagre	RFB (VNC), SPICE, RDP, SSH	The GNOME Project	2007	2019-05-08, 3.32.2	GPL-2.0-or-later	Yes	Yes
xpra	Bencode-based, rencode-based, YAML-based, RFB (VNC) for desktop mode	Nathaniel Smith	2008	2025-04-23, 6.3	GPL-2.0-or-later	Yes	Yes
X11vnc	RFB (VNC)	Karl Runge	2001	2019, 0.9.16	GPL-2.0-or-later	Yes	Yes
X2Go	NX	Oleksandr Shneyder and Heinz-M. Graesing	2006	2020-02-13, 4.1.2.2	GPL-2.0-or-later	Yes	Yes
x2x	X11	David Chaiken	1996	2003, 1.27	BSD	Yes	Yes

== Operating system support ==
Software	Windows		macOS		Linux		FreeBSD		Java (client)	Android		iOS		Blackberry (client)	Windows Mobile		ChromeOS (client)
Software	Server	Client	Server	Client	Server	Client	Server	Client	Java (client)	Client	Server	Client	Server	Blackberry (client)	Server	Client	ChromeOS (client)
AetherPal	Yes	Yes	Yes	Yes	No	No	No	No	No	Yes	?	Yes	No	Yes	No	Yes	?
Ammyy Admin	Yes	Yes	No	No	No	No	No	No	No	No	?	No	No	No	No	No	?
AnyDesk	Yes	Yes	Yes	Yes	Yes	Yes	Yes	Yes	No	Yes	Yes	Yes	No	No	No	No	Yes
AppliDis	Yes	Yes	No	Yes	No	Yes	No	Yes	Yes	Yes	?	Yes	No	No	No	Yes	?
Apple Remote Desktop	No	No	Yes	Yes	?	No	No	No	No	No	?	No	No	No	No	No	?
Cendio ThinLinc	No	Yes	No	Yes	Yes	Yes	No	Yes (Note: Web Access Client with Android support.)	No	Yes (Note: Web Access Client with iOS support.)	No	Yes (Note: Web Access Client with touch support.)	No	Yes	No	Yes	Yes
Citrix XenApp	Yes	Yes	No	Yes	Yes	Yes	No	Yes	Yes	Yes	?	Yes	No	Yes	No	Yes	?
Ericom Connect	Yes	Yes	Yes	Yes	Yes	Yes	No	Yes	No	Yes	No	Yes	No	No	No	Yes	Yes
GO-Global	?	Yes	?	Yes	?	Yes	?	No	Yes	Yes	?	Yes	No	No	?	Yes	?
Goverlan Systems Management (Goverlan Reach Remote Control)	Yes	Yes	Yes	Yes	Yes	Yes	Yes	Yes	No	No	No	No	No	No	No	No	No
GoToMyPC	Yes	Yes	Yes	Yes	No	Yes	No	No	Yes	Yes	?	Yes	No	No	No	Yes	?
HP Remote Graphics Software (RGS) / ZCentral Remote Boost	Yes	Yes	No	Yes	Yes	Yes	No	No	No	No	?	No	No	No	?	Yes	?
IBM Director Remote Control	Yes	Yes	No	No	No	No	No	No	Yes	No	?	No	No	No	No	No	?
I'm InTouch	Yes	No	No	No	No	No	No	No	No	No	?	No	No	No	No	No	?
KRDC	No	No	No	No	No	Yes	No	Yes	No	No	?	No	No	No	No	No	?
LogMeIn Pro	Yes	Yes	Yes	Yes	No	No	No	No	Yes	Yes	?	Yes	No	No	No	Yes	?
Mikogo	?	Yes	?	Yes (Note: Some features are MS Windows-only.)	?	Yes (Note: Some features are MS Windows- and Apple Mac-only.)	?	No	No	Yes (Note: Available to view a remote desktop from Google Android Linux devices.)	?	Yes (Note: Available to view a remote desktop from Apple iOS devices.)	No	No	?	No	?
NetSupport Manager	Yes	Yes	Yes	Yes	Yes	Yes	?	Yes	Yes	Yes	?	Yes	No	No	?	Yes	?
Netviewer	?	Yes	?	No	?	No	?	No	No	Yes	?	?	No	No	?	No	?
NX Technology (NoMachine)	Yes	Yes	Yes	Yes	Yes	Yes	No	No	No	Yes	No	Yes	No	No	No	Yes	Yes
Oracle Secure Global Desktop Software	Yes	Yes	Yes	Yes	Yes	Yes	Yes	Yes	Yes	No	?	No	No	No	?	No	?
Parsec	Yes	Yes	Yes	Yes	No	Yes	No	No	No	Yes	No	No	No	No	No	No	Yes
Proxy Networks	Yes	Yes	Yes	Yes	No	Yes	No	Yes	No	Yes	?	Yes	No	No	No	No	Yes
QVD	No	Yes	No	Yes	Yes	Yes	No	Yes	Yes	Yes	?	Yes	No	No	No	No	?
rdesktop	No	Yes	?	Yes	No	Yes	?	Yes	Yes	?	?	?	No	No	?	No	?
RealVNC Free	Yes	Yes	Yes	Yes	Yes	Yes	No	Yes	Yes	Yes	?	Yes	No	No	?	No	?
RealVNC Personal	Yes	Yes	Yes	Yes	Yes	Yes	No	No	Yes	Yes	?	Yes	No	No	?	No	?
RealVNC Enterprise	Yes	Yes	Yes	Yes	Yes	Yes	No	No	Yes	Yes	?	Yes	No	No	?	No	?
Remmina	No	No	No	No	No	Yes	No	Yes	No	No	?	No	No	No	?	No	?
Remote Desktop Services/Terminal Services	Yes	Yes	No	Yes (Note: There exists an "official" client for Apple Mac OS, as well as several independent implementations. See for example the "CoRD" entry above, an alternative open source RDP client for Mac)	Yes	Yes	No	Yes	?	Yes	?	Yes	No	No	?	Yes (Note: Windows Mobile Remote Desktop is an optional part of WM 6.1.)	?
Remote Utilities	Yes	Yes	No	No	No	No	No	No	No	Yes	No	Yes	No	No	No	No	No
RustDesk	Yes	Yes	No	Yes	Yes	Yes	Yes	?	No	Yes	Yes	Yes	No	No	No	No	?
ScreenConnect	Yes	Yes	Yes	Yes	Yes	Yes	Yes	Yes	Yes	Yes	?	Yes	No	No	No	No	?
Splashtop	Yes	Yes	Yes	Yes	No	No	No	Yes	Yes	Yes	Yes	Yes	No	Yes	Yes	Yes	Yes
SSH with X forwarding	No	Yes (Note: To use Windows or Mac OS X as a client, an X server needs to be installed and running. Windows or Mac OS X can be used as a server, if they have an SSH server running; but only X11 applications (not native GUI applications) can display their GUI on the client; on Windows these probably have to be run within Cygwin.)	No	Yes	Yes	Yes	Yes	Yes	No	Yes	?	Yes	No	No	?	No	?
Sun Ray/SRSS	?	Yes	?	No	?	Yes	?	No	Yes	No	?	No	No	No	?	No	?
Sub7	?	No	?	No	?	No	?	No	Yes	?	?	?	No	No	?	No	?
Symantec pcAnywhere	?	Yes	?	Yes	?	Yes	?	No	Yes	?	?	?	No	Yes	?	Yes	?
TeamViewer	Yes	Yes	Yes	Yes	Yes	Yes	No	No	Yes	Yes	Yes	Yes	No	Yes	Yes	Yes	Yes
Techinline	Yes	Yes	No	No	No	No	No	No	No	No	?	No	No	No	No	No	?
TigerVNC	Yes	Yes	No	Yes	Yes	Yes	Yes (Note: Requires installation from source.)	Yes	Yes	No	?	No	No	No	No	No	?
TightVNC	Yes	Yes	No	Yes (Note: As X application, 1.3.x version only.)	Yes (Note: 1.3.x version only "Download (Previous Versions)". TightVNC.)	Yes	Yes	Yes	Yes	Yes	?	?	No	No	?	No	?
Timbuktu	Yes	Yes	Yes	Yes	No	No	No	No	No	No	No	No	No	No	No	No	No
TurboVNC	No	Yes	No	Yes (Note: Bundled Java application that uses libjpeg-turbo native library for accelerated JPEG decompression.)	Yes	Yes (Note: Bundled Java application that uses libjpeg-turbo native library for accelerated JPEG decompression.)	Yes	Yes	Yes (Note: Can use libjpeg-turbo through JNI to accelerate JPEG decompression.)	No	?	No	No	No	No	No	?
UltraVNC	Yes	Yes (Note: UltraVNC 1.0.4 RC4 claims "Greatly improved Vista support" as of 1 October 2007.)	No	No	No	No	No	No	Yes	No	No	No	No	No	No	No	?
Veyon	Yes	Yes	No	No	Yes	Yes	No	No	No	No	?	No	No	No	No	No	?
xpra	Yes (Note: No seamless mode)	Yes	Yes	Yes	Yes	Yes	Yes	Yes	No (Note: Working code exists but it is unmaintained)	No	No	No	No	No	No	No	No (Note: The server includes a built-in HTML5 client)
X11vnc	No	Yes	Yes	Yes	Yes	Yes	?	Yes	Yes	?	?	?	No	No	?	No	?
X2Go	No	Yes	No	Yes	Yes	Yes	No	Yes	No	No	?	No	No	No	No	No	?
x2x	No (Note: It is designed to run only on the client; it can connect to any X11 server.)	No (Note: This could actually work when running an X server, but it is easier to use Win2VNC instead.)	No	Yes	No	Yes	No	Yes	No	?	No	?	No	No	No	No	?
MeshCentral	Yes	Yes	Yes	Yes	Yes	Yes	Yes	Yes	No	Yes	No	No	No	No	No	No	Yes
Software	Server	Client	Server	Client	Server	Client	Server	Client	Java (client)	Client	Server	Client	Server	Blackberry (client)	Server	Client	ChromeOS (client)

== Features ==
Software	Client/server /listening	Built-in encryption	File transfer	Audio support	Multiple sessions	Seamless window	Remote assistance	Access permission request	NAT passthrough	IPv6 support	Maximum simultaneous connections	Video	3D	Drag and drop file transfer	Multiple passwords for remote access	Session recording	Screen blanking	USB forwarding	Export network services	Remote Printing	Smartcard authentication	Whiteboard	Chat tool	H.264 support	Browser-based access	Session persistence	Free for personal use	Free for commercial use
AetherPal	Client & server	SSL, TLS	Yes	No	Yes	Yes	Yes	Yes	Yes	?	Unlimited	?	?	?	?	?	?	?	?	?	?	?	?	?	?	?	No	No
Ammyy Admin	Client & server	AES, RSA	Yes	Yes	Yes	Yes	Yes	Yes	Yes	?	?	Yes	?	No	No	No	?	?	?	No	?	?	No	?	No	No	Yes	No
AnyDesk	Client & server	SSL, TLS 1.2, AES	Yes	Yes	Yes	?	Yes	Yes	Yes	No	Unlimited (depends on license)	Yes	Yes	Yes	?	Yes	Yes	?	?	Yes	?	Yes	Yes	?	Yes	?	Yes	No
Anyplace Control	Client & server	RC4, RSA	Yes	Yes	Yes	Yes	Yes	Yes	Yes	?	Unlimited	?	?	?	?	?	?	?	?	?	?	?	?	?	?	?	No	No
AppliDis	Client & server	Yes	Yes	Yes	Yes	Yes	Yes	Yes	Yes	No	Unlimited	Yes	Yes	No	No	?	?	?	?	?	?	?	?	?	?	?	No	No
Apple Remote Desktop	Client & server	AES-128	Yes	No	Yes	No	Yes	Yes (Note: Only for non-admin users.)	No	Yes	Unlimited	?	?	?	?	?	?	?	?	?	?	?	?	?	?	?	No	No
Apple Screen Sharing (iChat)	Client & server	AES-256	No	No	Yes	No	?	?	?	Yes	Unlimited	?	?	?	?	?	?	?	?	?	?	?	?	?	?	?	Yes	Yes
Cendio ThinLinc	Client & server (Linux only)	SSH, TLS	Yes	Yes	Yes	Yes	Yes	Yes	Yes	Yes (Note: Only when host names are used.)	Unlimited	Yes	VirtualGL	No	Yes	No	?	No	No	Yes	Yes	No	No	No	Yes	Yes	Yes	Yes
Chrome Remote Desktop	Client & server	SSL, TLS	Yes	Yes	Yes	No	Yes	Yes	Yes	Yes	Unlimited	Yes	?	?	?	?	?	?	?	?	?	?	?	?	?	?	Yes	Yes
Citrix XenApp	Client & server	SSL, TLS	Yes	Yes	Yes	Yes	Yes	Yes	Yes	Yes	Unlimited	Yes	Yes	?	?	?	?	Yes	?	Yes	Yes	?	?	Yes	Yes	?	No	No
Ericom Connect	Client & server	SSL, TLS	Yes	Yes	Yes	Yes	Yes	Yes	Yes	Yes	Unlimited	Yes	Yes	Yes	Yes	No	?	Yes	No	Yes	Yes	No	Yes	Yes	Yes	?	No	No
GO-Global	Client & server	SSL, DES-56, DES-168, AES-256	Yes	Yes	Yes	Yes	?	?	?	?	?	?	?	?	?	?	?	?	?	?	?	?	?	?	?	?	No	No
Goverlan Systems Management (Goverlan Reach Remote Control)	Client & server	Yes	Yes	Yes	Yes	Yes	Yes	Yes	Yes	Yes	Unlimited	Yes	Yes	Yes	Yes	Yes	Yes	Yes	Yes	Yes	Yes	Yes	Yes	Yes	Yes	?	No	No
GoToMyPC	?	Yes	Yes	Yes	?	?	Yes	Yes	?	?	?	?	?	?	?	?	?	?	?	?	?	?	?	?	?	?	No	No
HP Remote Graphics Software (RGS)	Client & server	Yes	Yes	Yes	Yes	Yes	Yes	Yes	?	No	Unlimited	Yes	Yes	No	Yes	No	Yes	Yes	?	?	Yes	No	No	Yes	?	?	Yes	Yes
IBM Director Remote Control	Client & server	AES, Triple DES, DES	Yes	No	Yes	No	?	?	?	?	?	?	?	?	?	?	?	?	?	?	?	?	?	?	?	?	No	No
I'm InTouch	Web client & Win server	SSL, AES-256	Yes	Yes	Yes	No	?	?	?	?	?	?	?	?	?	?	?	?	?	?	?	?	?	?	?	?	No	No
KRDC	Client only	No	No	Yes	Yes	Yes	?	?	?	?	?	?	?	?	?	?	?	?	?	?	?	?	?	?	?	?	Yes	Yes
LogMeIn	Pro only	SSL, TLS	?	Yes	?	?	?	?	?	?	?	?	?	?	?	Yes	?	?	?	Yes	?	Yes	?	?	?	?	No	No
Mikogo	Client & server (Note: Connections are centrally negotiated via Mikogo server.)	AES-256	Yes	No	Yes (Note: Up to ten participants.)	No	?	?	?	?	?	?	?	?	?	?	?	?	?	?	?	?	?	?	?	?	Yes	No
NetSupport Manager	Client & server	Yes	Yes	Yes	Yes	Yes	Yes	Yes	Yes	No	Unlimited	Yes	Yes	?	?	?	?	?	?	?	?	?	?	?	?	?	No	No
Netviewer	Client & server	AES-128	Yes	Yes	Yes	No	Yes	Yes (Note: 8 simultaneously.)	?	?	?	?	?	?	?	?	?	?	?	?	?	?	?	?	?	?	No	No
NX technology (NoMachine)	Client & server	SSL, TLS & AES 128	Yes	Yes	Yes	Yes	Yes	Yes	Yes	Yes	Yes	Yes	Yes	Yes	Yes	Yes	Yes	Yes	Yes	Yes	Yes	Yes	Yes	Yes	Yes	Yes	Yes	No
Oracle Secure Global Desktop Software/Sun VDI	Client & server	SSL, TLS (AES-256)	Yes	Yes	Yes	Yes	?	?	?	?	?	?	?	?	?	?	?	?	?	?	?	?	?	?	?	?	No	No
Parsec	Client, Win8+ server & Enterprise Relay	DTLS (AES-128)	No	Yes	Yes	No	Yes	Yes	Yes	Yes	?	Yes	Yes	No	No	No	Paid	No	No	No	No	No	Yes	Yes	Yes	Yes	Yes	No
Proxy Networks	Client, server, & gateway	SSL, AES-256	Yes	No	Yes	Yes	Yes	Yes	Yes, client	Yes	Unlimited	Yes	Yes	Yes	Yes	Yes	Yes	No	No	No	No	No	Yes	?	Yes	?	No	No
QVD	Client & server	SSL	Yes	Yes	Yes	Yes	Yes	No	Yes	Yes	Unlimited	No	No	Yes	No	?	?	?	?	?	?	?	?	?	?	?	Yes	Yes
rdesktop	Client only	Yes	Yes	Yes	Yes	Yes (Note: With the addition of SeamlessRDP.)	?	?	?	Yes	?	?	?	?	?	?	?	?	?	?	?	?	?	?	?	?	Yes	Yes
RealVNC Home	Client, server & listening	AES-128	No	No	Yes	No	Yes	Yes	Yes in listening mode	No	Unlimited	?	?	?	?	?	?	?	?	?	?	?	?	?	?	?	?	?
RealVNC Professional	Client, server & listening	AES-128	Yes	Yes	Yes	No	Yes	Yes	Yes in listening mode	Yes	Unlimited	?	?	?	?	?	?	?	?	?	?	?	?	?	?	?	?	?
RealVNC Enterprise	Client, server & listening	AES-256	Yes	Yes	Yes	No	Yes	Yes	Yes in listening mode	Yes	Unlimited	?	?	?	?	?	Yes	?	?	?	?	?	?	?	Yes (Note: Using a Java applet.)	?	?	?
Remmina	Client only	AES-256	Yes	Yes	Yes	Yes	Yes	Yes	Yes	Yes	Unlimited	?	?	Yes	?	?	?	Yes	?	Yes	Yes	?	Yes	?	No (Note: Since it is a GTK+ application, it can be accessed using the Broadway HTML5 back-end, but this is not yet mature or a full replacement for a browser remote desktop client.)	?	Yes	Yes
Remote Desktop Services/Terminal Services	Client & server	Yes	Yes	Yes	Yes (Note: Remote Desktop Services are single user only. Local screen is locked when remote user connects and local user can not view remote user's activities. Remote user is disconnected when local user logs in. Terminal Services use multiple independent desktops. Local user views its own desktop and can not view remote user's activities. Local user is not notified when remote user connects.)	Yes (Note: Provided the server is running Windows 2008 or later.)	Yes (Note: Assistance mode uses a separate client named MSRA (Microsoft Remote Assistance). Remote user must approve your access in assistance mode.)	Yes (Note: Access approval is always requested in assistance mode and never in remote access mode.)	No	Yes	Unlimited	Yes	Yes	?	?	?	?	?	?	?	?	?	?	?	?	Yes	Yes	Yes
Remote Utilities	Client & server	AES-256	Yes	Yes	Yes	Yes	Yes	Yes	Yes	Yes	Unlimited (depends on license)	?	?	Yes	Yes	Yes	Yes	?	?	Yes	No	No	Yes	No	No	?	Yes	No
RustDesk	Client & server	Yes	Yes	Yes	Yes	?	Yes	Yes	Yes	?	?	?	?	?	?	?	?	?	Yes	?	?	?	Yes	?	Yes	?	Yes	Yes
ScreenConnect	Client & server	AES-256	Yes	Yes	Yes	Yes	Yes	Yes	Yes	?	?	?	?	Yes	?	?	?	?	?	?	?	?	?	?	?	?	No	No
Splashtop	Client & server	Yes	Yes	Yes	Yes	Yes	Yes	Yes	Yes	Yes	Unlimited	Yes	Yes	Yes	?	Yes	Yes	?	?	Yes	?	Yes	Yes	?	Yes	?	No	No
SSH with X forwarding	Client & server	Yes	Yes	Partial (Note: When using something like pulseaudio)	Yes (Note: No sessions at all, just individual windows. However one can use Xnest.)	Yes	?	?	No	Yes (Note: OpenSSH supports IPv6 and IPv6 forwarding.)	Unlimited	Yes	Yes, server side	Yes	Yes	?	?	?	?	?	Yes	?	?	?	?	No	Yes	Yes
Sun Ray/SRSS	Client, server, & hardware	Yes	No	Yes	Yes	No	?	?	?	?	?	?	?	?	?	?	?	?	?	?	?	?	?	?	?	?	?	?
Sub7	Client & server	No	No	No	No	No	?	?	?	?	?	?	?	?	?	?	?	?	?	?	?	?	?	?	?	?	Yes	Yes
Symantec pcAnywhere	Client & server	AES-256	Yes	No	Yes	No	Yes	Yes	?	No	?	Yes	?	Yes	?	Yes	Yes	?	?	Yes	?	Yes	Yes	?	?	?	No	No
TeamViewer	Client & server	AES-256	Yes	Partial (Note: Audio sharing not available on Mac)	Yes	No	Yes	Yes	Yes, client & server	Yes	3-15 (Note: 3 with the free version; up to 15 with a license)	Yes	No	Yes	Yes	Yes	Yes	No	?	Yes	No	Yes	Yes	?	Yes	?	Yes	No
Techinline	Client & server	Yes	Yes	No	Yes	?	Yes	Yes	Yes	?	1 or unlimited	?	?	?	?	?	?	?	?	?	?	?	?	?	?	?	No	No
TightVNC	Client, server & listening	SSH (Unix client only)	Yes	No	Yes	No	Yes	Yes	Yes in listening mode	No	Unlimited	?	?	No	?	?	?	?	?	?	?	?	?	?	?	?	Yes	Yes
TigerVNC	Client, server & listening	SSL, TLS	No	No	Yes	No	No	No	Yes in listening mode	Yes	Unlimited	Yes	?	?	?	?	?	?	?	?	?	?	?	Yes	?	Yes	Yes	Yes
Timbuktu	Client & server	Yes	Yes	No	Yes	No	Yes	Yes	?	?	?	?	?	?	?	?	?	?	?	?	?	?	?	?	?	?	Yes	Yes
TurboVNC	Client, server & listening	SSL, TLS, SSH	No	No	Yes	No	No	No	Yes in listening mode	Yes	Unlimited	Yes	VirtualGL	No	Yes	No	No	No	No	No	No	No	No	No	Yes	?	Yes	Yes
UltraVNC	Client & server & listening	With plugin	Yes	No	Yes	Partial (Note: UltraVNC allows a single Window to be shown, however it is still doing full screen polling and not capturing the application details. This can cause other windows to overlap and popup windows to "disappear".)	Yes	Yes	Yes, with SC version + external "Repeater" server	Yes	Unlimited	No	No	?	?	?	Yes	No	No	No	No	No	Yes	No	No	?	Yes	Yes
Veyon	Client & server	SSH	No	No	Yes	No	Yes	No	No	No	Unlimited	Yes	No	No	Token-Based	?	?	?	?	?	?	?	?	?	?	?	Yes	Yes
xpra	Client & server	SSH, TLS, AES	Yes	Yes	Yes	Yes (Note: Only for X sessions.)	Yes	Yes	Yes, server (Note: Using the proxy server.)	Yes	Unlimited	Yes	VirtualGL	Yes	Yes (Note: Through SSH and/or xpra's authentication modules.)	Yes (Note: Via configuration and external tools.)	No	No	No	Yes	No	No	No	Yes	Yes	Yes	Yes	Yes
X11vnc	Server only	SSL	Yes	No	Yes	No	Yes	?	?	Yes	Unlimited	?	?	?	?	?	?	?	?	?	?	?	?	?	?	?	Yes	Yes
X2Go	Client & server	SSH	Yes	Yes (Note: Via PulseAudio.)	Yes	Yes	Yes	?	?	?	?	?	?	?	?	?	?	?	?	?	?	?	?	?	?	Yes	Yes	Yes
x2x	Client only	Yes (Note: Can be used over SSH session.)	No	No	Yes	—N/a	?	?	?	?	?	?	?	?	?	?	?	?	?	?	?	?	?	?	?	?	Yes	Yes
MeshCentral	Client & server	TLS 1.3	Yes	No	Yes	?	Yes	Yes	Yes	Yes	Unlimited	Yes	?	Yes	Yes	Yes	No	No	?	?	No	?	Yes	Yes	Yes	Yes	Yes	Yes

=== Terminology ===
In the table above, the following terminology is intended to be used to describe some important features:

- Listening mode: where a server connects to a viewer. The server site does not have to configure its firewall/NAT to allow access on a defined port; the onus is on the viewer, which is useful if the server site has no computer expertise, while the viewer user would be expected to be more knowledgeable.
- Built-in encryption: the software has at least one method of encrypting the data between the local and remote computers, and the encryption mechanism is built into the remote control software.
- File transfer: the software allows the user to transfer files between the local and remote computers, from within the client software's user interface.
- Audio support: the remote control software transfers audio signals across the network and plays the audio through the speakers attached to the local computer. For example, music playback software normally sends audio signals to the locally attached speakers, via some sound controller hardware. If the remote control software package supports audio transfer, the playback software can run on the remote computer, while the music can be heard from the local computer, as though the software were running locally.
- Multiple sessions: the ability to connect to a server as many users, and have each one see their individual desktops.
- Seamless window: the software allows an application to be run on the server, and just the application window to be shown on the client's desktop. Normally the remote user interface chrome is also removed, giving the impression that the application is running on the client machines.
- Remote assistance: remote and local users are able to view the same screen at the same time, so a remote user can assist a local user.
- Access permission request: local user should approve a remote access session start.
- NAT passthrough: the ability to connect to the server behind a NAT without configuring the router's port forwarding rules. It offers an advantage when you can't reconfigure the router/firewall (for example in case it is on the Internet service provider's side), but is a serious security risk (unless the traffic is end-to-end encrypted), because all the traffic will pass through some proxy server which in most cases is owned by the remote access application's developers.
- Maximum simultaneous connections: number of clients connected to the same session
- Screen blanking: the ability to prevent the user of the host/server from viewing what is currently being displayed on the screen while a remote user is connected.
- Remote Printing: the remote user can print a file from the host computer to a printer connected to the client computer.
- Session persistence: unsaved work will not be lost when the user disconnects or in the event of connection loss
- IPv6 support: supports connections over IPv6

== See also ==
- Comparison of SSH clients
- List of Remote Desktop Protocol clients
