= Multiplicity (software) =

Multiplicity is a computer program that enables one keyboard and mouse to access two or more client computers from a host computer. It was developed for Stardock as part of their ThinkDesk subscription service, but is available separately.

== Operation and features ==
Multiplicity is unlike remote desktop applications in that instead of opening windows to a client computer on a host computer’s desktop, the mouse pointer and keyboard focus shifts from one computer to another. It is closer in concept to a KVM switch, but while these have multiple cables to each computer, with Multiplicity the keyboard and mouse remain connected to the host computer and input is forwarded from the host to client machines via network connections — typically over TCP/IP port 30564. Each computer uses its own display. Switching is triggered by movement of the mouse to the appropriate side of the screen (or keyboard shortcuts, if desired), both from the desktop and in full-screen video modes.

Multiplicity comes in two versions; the standard Multiplicity has the ability to copy and paste images and text between computers, while Multiplicity Pro can control up to nine client computers and can copy files, folders, and other data between machines.

Supported platforms as of 2016 are Windows 10, 8, 7 and Vista; Windows XP (32-bit only); and Windows Server 2003 / 2003 R2, 2008 / 2008 R2, 2012 / 2012 R2.

Multiplicity can emulate the capability of the KVM switch and let one display serve all the connected computers. The modern alternative would be the combination of an HDMI switch and a USB switch (aka a KVM), but the software-hardware comparison remains equally valid.

Multiplicity does not permit combining computers with different operating systems, like macOS and Linux.

== Alternatives ==
- x2x – Software for the X Window System that allows the console (keyboard and mouse) on one X terminal to be used to control another X terminal. It also provides ancillary functions like clipboard sharing. Developed in 1996 by David Chaiken at DEC.
- Synergy – A free software option that allows users to use a single keyboard and mouse to control multiple computers over TCP/IP. It is multiplatform (supporting Windows, macOS, Linux, and others), and supports text copy and paste. More capable version of ShareMouse, and made by the same company.
- Mouse without Borders - This is a Garage product from Microsoft that allows a single keyboard and mouse to operate up to four different computers.
- Barrier – A Creative Commons fork of Synergy's 1.9 branch.
