= ScreenConnect =

Remote desktop software

- Original author: Elsinore Technologies
- Developer: ConnectWise
- Operating system: Windows; Linux macOS; Android iOS
- Type: Remote desktop software
- License: Proprietary
- Website: screenconnect.com

ScreenConnect (previously ConnectWise Control and ConnectWise ScreenConnect), is a self-hosted remote desktop software application. It was originally developed by Elsinore Technologies in 2008 under the name ScreenConnect. In 2015, it became a subsidiary of ConnectWise Inc.

== History ==
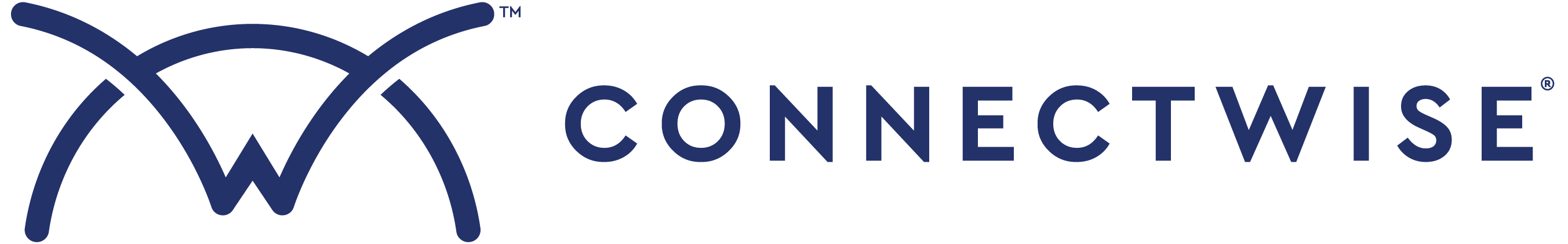
Logo of ScreenConnect's parent company, ConnectWise

Elsinore Technologies developed ScreenConnect in 2008 as an add-on to its RMM software, IssueNet, to assist in providing remote support to end users. It later began distributing the software as a standalone product.

=== Acquisition by ConnectWise ===
On February 11, 2015, IT management software company ConnectWise announced its acquisition of the ScreenConnect software to improve the remote control features of the latest release of its RMM Software, LabTech. ScreenConnect, LLC announced that, despite being acquired by ConnectWise, it would continue to operate under its original name in addition to offering its software as a standalone product.

Starting in early 2017, as part of a brand-unification strategy driven by Arnie Bellini, founder and CEO, ConnectWise changed the name of ScreenConnect to ConnectWise Control to simplify its software suite under one company. The other business entities were similarly rebranded to Manage, Automate, and Sell—all under the ConnectWise company brand.

On May 15, 2023, ConnectWise Control was rebranded back to ConnectWise ScreenConnect.

On Thursday, February 22, 2024, version 6 of the self-hosted edition server application of ScreenConnect reported a vulnerability. A patch was available for the latest version (23) the same day, offering a temporary free upgrade.

Later in 2024, ConnectWise ScreenConnect was rebranded back to ScreenConnect.

== Product ==
ScreenConnect offers three primary products:

- ScreenConnect Remote Support: Enables technicians to connect remotely with end users for troubleshooting and issue resolution
- ScreenConnect Remote Access: Allows technicians to manage and maintain systems without disrupting users, such as running diagnostics
- ScreenConnect Privileged Access: Allows IT to authorize user management and network security through least-privilege control

=== How it works ===
The product is available as a cloud-hosted Software as a Service (SaaS) or self-hosted server application that permits the primary user to host the software on their own servers, PC, virtual machine (VM), or virtual private server (VPS). Once installed, the central web application can be made visible inside and outside of the local area network (LAN). ScreenConnect has a proprietary protocol and exposes an open architecture structure that can be utilized by users to implement custom plugins, scripting, or various integrations.

A generic use model would start with a host initiating a session through the central web application. A participant would then join a session by clicking on an email link or via the guest page of the application. An unattended client can be created and deployed to a targeted machine without the need for human intervention. The executable is ScreenConnect.ClientService.exe (x86) on Windows-based OSs, and is signed by a COMODO RSA Code Signing CA certificate [Publisher: ScreenConnect Software].

=== Features ===
Most commonly expected features for a product in this arena are present. Examples include reboot and reconnect, drag-and-drop file transfer, screen recording, safe mode support, multiple monitor, command line access, wake-on-LAN, VoIP, and chat. More advanced capabilities include Backstage, a background troubleshooting mode that provides secure access to system tools without disrupting the end user; centralized device and process management; a shared toolbox for scripts and executables; agent deployment tools for large-scale rollouts; and optional bridge connectivity to RDP or VNC sessions on unmanaged devices.

In addition to features that facilitate communication, ScreenConnect has offered control over branding and customization of the product design, logo, color scheme, icons, text strings, and localization. In 2025, some higher-risk customizations (such as hiding the connection banner or system-tray icon) were restricted to reduce opportunities for misuse, while limited visual options remain available.

=== Security ===
The software is self-hosted providing users the ability to control the flow of data behind their own firewall and security implementations. ScreenConnect uses 256-bit AES encryption to package and ship data, supports two-factor authentication, has server-level video auditing, and granular role-based security. Forms-based and Windows Authentication are optional authentication methods for security purposes.

=== Compatibility ===
The host (presenter or technician) can utilize Mac, Linux, Windows, iOS, or Android operating systems. Guest (customer or participant): can connect from Mac, Linux, or Windows. ScreenConnect can also be utilized to remotely support Android devices, with complete view and control available for devices manufactured by Samsung.

=== Integrations ===
ScreenConnect supports third-party integrations such as Acronis Cyber Protect Cloud, Freshdesk, and Zendesk and ServiceNow. ScreenConnect also integrates with other ConnectWise products, including ConnectWise RMM and PSA.

== Technology ==
=== Server ===
The on-site ScreenConnect server is self-hosted and runs as a .NET Framework application. On Microsoft Windows, it runs as a set of services. In 2015, ScreenConnect launched a hosted cloud platform, providing a way to use the ScreenConnect software with no local server installation required.

The ScreenConnect server runs as a set of four discrete services:

- The Web Server service is an outward-facing ASP.NET HTTP application and serves as a portal for both technicians and their end-users
- The Relay service provides outward-facing in-session communication and operates on TCP sockets. Communication is encrypted with the AES-256 block cipher.
- The Session Manager service provides a data store for both the Web Server and Relay services. It is implemented as a WCF SOAP web service.
- The Security Manager service provides a data store for security-related activities, including authentication and auditing

=== Clients ===
ScreenConnect sessions are arranged through the web application. Once users join sessions, a ScreenConnect client is launched to connect to the Relay service. ScreenConnect targets clients based on device and operating system:

- The .NET client is targeted to Microsoft Windows computers and is activated with a custom URI scheme, which starts the session from an installed handler on the controller's workstation. For end users joining a support session, a variety of bootstrappers can be used, including Microsoft's ClickOnce technology.
- The Java client is targeted to OS X and Linux computers and is activated with Java Web Start.
- The iOS client is targeted to iPhones and iPads.
- The Android client is targeted to Android phones and tablets.

== Licensing model ==
ScreenConnect is commercial software. Licenses sit in a pool and are available to any user on any workstation. There are two types of licenses: cloud and self-hosted (on-premises).

=== Self-hosted ===
ScreenConnect’s self-hosted license model uses a perpetual license. Purchases include one year of maintenance and support, which provides access to major and minor software updates released during that period. Maintenance and support can be renewed at the end of the first year. Renewal pricing depends on when the update license was last renewed. Licensing is by concurrent sessions, starting at three concurrent sessions with unlimited named users. Additional concurrent-session licenses may be added.

=== Cloud ===
ScreenConnect offers two types of cloud licensing: support and access. Support licenses include remote support sessions, remote meetings, and unattended access. These use a concurrent technician model, meaning the number of simultaneous sessions depends on the number of licenses purchased. Access licenses focus exclusively on unattended device access. These use an agent-based model, where pricing is determined by the number of devices under management, but with no limit on the number of concurrent connections.

== Misuse ==
ScreenConnect is one of several remote monitoring and management (RMM) tools being employed in rising cybersecurity attacks.

The program, under its previous name of ConnectWise ScreenConnect, has been used in fraudulent technical support scams where the fraudster is able to gain control of the victim's computer by telephoning and tricking the user into installing the software and permitting a connection. The free trial period has been utilized to avoid any software costs in doing this, and similar products, such as TeamViewer, AnyDesk, and Ammyy Admin, have also been used for the scam.

Cybercriminal group LockBit exploited vulnerabilities in ScreenConnect. Following this event, ConnectWise CISO Patrick Beggs reported that the company has since discovered new processes to identify unpatched instances. The parent company has since spoken publicly about how it leveraged AI to navigate the security crisis.

In August 2025, ScreenConnect limited several high-risk branding and interface customizations to reduce opportunities for misuse by malicious actors and to improve end-user awareness. The connection banner and system-tray icon can no longer be hidden; product logos and the Guest-page background were reset to defaults; and downloaded client filenames can no longer be renamed. The company indicated it is considering limited, low-risk branding options (for example, background colors/gradients).

== See also ==
- Remote support
- Desktop sharing
- Web conferencing
