= TigerVNC =

Open source software

- Initial release: February 27, 2009; 17 years ago
- Stable release: 1.16.2 / 26 March 2026; 2 months ago
- Written in: C, C++, Java
- Operating system: Server: Linux; Client: MS Windows (32-bit/64-bit) (NT/2000/XP), POSIX (Linux/BSD/OS X/UNIX-like OSes), MinGW/MSYS (MS Windows)
- Available in: English
- Type: Remote desktop, Remote administration, Distributed computing
- License: GPL-2.0-or-later
- Website: tigervnc.org
- Repository: github.com/TigerVNC/tigervnc

TigerVNC is an open source Virtual Network Computing (VNC) server and client software, started as a fork of TightVNC in 2009. The client supports Windows, Linux and macOS. The server supports Linux. There is no server for macOS and as of release 1.11.0 the Windows server is no longer maintained.

== History ==
Red Hat, Cendio AB, and TurboVNC maintainers started this fork because RealVNC had focused on their enterprise non-open VNC and no TightVNC update had appeared since 2006. The past few years however, Cendio AB who use it for their product ThinLinc is the main contributor to the project. TigerVNC is fully open-source, with development and discussion done via publicly accessible mailing lists and repositories.

TigerVNC has a different feature set than TightVNC, despite its origins. For example, TigerVNC adds encryption for all supported operating systems and not just Linux. Conversely, TightVNC has features that TigerVNC doesn't have, such as file transfers.

TigerVNC focuses on performance and on remote display functionality.

TigerVNC became the default VNC implementation in Fedora shortly after its creation.

A 2010 reviewer found the TigerVNC product "much faster than Vinagre, but not quite as responsive as Remmina".

== See also ==
- Comparison of remote desktop software
- RFB (protocol)
- X Window System
