= Goverlan Systems Management =

Goverlan Reach Remote Support Software
- Original authors: Goverlan, Inc.
- Developers: Goverlan, Inc.
- Release: 1998
- Stable release: v9.01 / December 21, 2018; 7 years ago
- Written in: C++
- Operating system: Microsoft Windows Mac OS X
- Type: Remote administration, Remote desktop software, remote support, IT Asset Management
- Website: goverlan.com

Goverlan Reach Systems Management is an on-premises client management software used primarily for tasks such as remote control, active directory management, configuration change management, and reporting within a Windows IT Infrastructure.

== History ==
Goverlan Reach, initially developed in 1996 for internal use at a New York City investment bank, later became a commercial product with the incorporation of Goverlan, Inc. in 1998.

In 2023, Goverlan (PJ Technologies) was acquired by EasyVista. The acquisition integrated Goverlan’s remote control, endpoint management, and IT process automation technologies into the EasyVista product portfolio.

== Features ==
Goverlan Reach provides various functionalities including remote support, IT process automation, software installation, inventory management, and remote control. The software includes tools for displaying system information, mapping printers, and Wake-on-LAN settings.

=== Remote Control ===
Goverlan Reach Remote Control (RC) is a remote desktop support software option for IT specialists. Goverlan allows for remote control and desktop sharing. With Goverlan, administrators can remote shadow multiple client sessions in a single pane and multiple administrators can participate in a single remote control session. In addition, an administrator can capture screenshots or video recordings during a remote session. There are other features that Goverlan Remote Control supports such as: remote assistance with the ability to connect to computers over the internet, transfer files, or view multiple sessions in one screen and control bandwidth used during a remote session. Goverlan supports Citrix XenApp and Microsoft Terminal Services shadowing.

=== Behind-the-scenes systems management ===
The Goverlan Administration & Diagnostics tool integrates into an existing Active Directory (AD) organization unit (OU) structure for Windows Systems management. Goverlan can perform remote administration on a single machine, group of machines, or entire domain. Goverlan is compatible with VDI, RDP, and Citrix deployments.

=== Global IT Process Automation module ===
The Goverlan IT Process Automation module allows IT administrators to manage various objects such as : software updates, reports generation, adding or removing registry keys, or any other actions that can be applied to a single computer or a network. Scope Actions allow IT administrators to execute configuration management tasks on client machines, query machines, collect information about user logged-in machines, hardware, software, or processes, and remote monitor workstations in real time, as opposed to retrieving information from a database. IT administrators may also use Goverlan for patch management to push patches to servers or workstations.

=== WMIX ===
WMIX is Goverlan free WMI Explorer which generates WMI queries using the WQL wizard and exports custom queries to other Windows. The WMIX tool makes use of pre-existing Windows Management Instrumentation scripts within an interface. A technician can generate a VBScript by defining parameters and clicking the generate script button.

== Technologies ==
- LDAP – The Lightweight Directory Access Protocol is used by Goverlan for Active Directory integration.
- WMI – The Windows Management Instrumentation technology is used by Goverlan to expose agent-free systems management services to Windows systems.
- Intel vPro AMT – The Intel Active Management Technology allows the out-of-band management of Intel vPro ready systems regardless of the system's power state.

== Security ==
Goverlan Systems Management Software provides the following security features:

- AES 256 bit Encryption (Windows Vista and later) or RSA 128 bit Encryption (Windows XP and earlier).
- Microsoft Security Support Provider Interface technology (SSPI) securely authenticates the identity of the person initiating a connection. SSPI is also used to impersonate the identity of this person on the client machine. Using the identity and privileges of the person who initiated the remote control session, the remote control session is either authorized or rejected.
- Central or machine level auditing of executed remote control sessions.
- Agents communicate through a single, encrypted TCP port.

== Limitations ==
Goverlan's desktop software can only be installed on Windows based computers (Windows XP and Above). Goverlan client agents can only be installed on Windows based computers (Windows 2000 and above) Goverlan requires the installation of client agents. However, client agents can be installed via a network rather than independently.

== See also ==
- Remote support
- List of systems management systems
- Comparison of remote desktop software
- Remote desktop software
- Desktop sharing
