= Splashtop =

Software

- Developer: Splashtop Inc.
- Release: August 2010
- Stable release: 3.8.0.4 / January 19, 2026; 9 months ago
- Preview release: None
- Operating system: Windows, macOS, ChromeOS, Android, iOS, Linux
- Type: Remote desktop, remote support
- License: Proprietary
- Website: www.splashtop.com

Splashtop is a family of remote-desktop software and remote support software, developed by Splashtop Inc. Splashtop enables users to remotely access or remotely support computers from desktop and mobile devices. Splashtop enables remote computer access for businesses, IT support and help desks, MSPs, and educational institutions.

== Company history ==
Splashtop Inc. is a privately held software company founded in 2006 and headquartered in Silicon Valley.

The company was founded in 2006 under the name DeviceVM Inc. Its first product, named Splashtop OS, was an ‘instant-on’ Linux-based computing platform. The company partners with OEMs and manufacturers to integrate this technology into personal computers. The company changed its name to Splashtop in 2010.

The original Splashtop Remote product was split into multiple products with the release of Splashtop Business in 2013. The original consumer-focused product was renamed Splashtop Personal. Splashtop Remote Support was announced in 2015 as Splashtop Business for Remote Support and later renamed Splashtop Remote Support. Splashtop On-Demand Support was introduced in 2015.

== See also ==
- Comparison of remote desktop software
