= SystemView =

SystemView may refer to:

- Former name of a product now called IBM Director
- Former name of an EEsof product now called SystemVue
