= Chrome Remote Desktop =

Remote desktop software tool

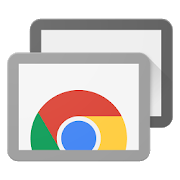
- Developer: Google
- Initial release: October 8, 2011; 14 years ago
- Stable release: 139.0.7258.8 / June 26, 2025; 4 months ago
- Operating system: ChromeOS, Linux (beta), macOS, iOS, Windows, Android
- Type: Remote desktop software
- License: Proprietary
- Website: remotedesktop.google.com

Chrome Remote Desktop is a remote desktop software tool, developed by Google, that allows a user to remotely control another computer's desktop through a proprietary protocol also developed by Google, internally called Chromoting. The protocol transmits the keyboard and mouse events from the client to the server, relaying the graphical screen updates back in the other direction over a computer network. This feature, therefore, consists of a server component for the host computer, and a client component on the computer accessing the remote server. Chrome Remote Desktop uses a unique protocol, as opposed to using the common Remote Desktop Protocol (developed by Microsoft).

== Software ==
The Chrome Remote Desktop client was originally a Chrome extension from the Chrome Web Store requiring Google Chrome; the extension is deprecated, and a web portal is available at remotedesktop.google.com. The browser must support WebRTC and other unspecified "modern web platform features". The client software is also available on Android and iOS.

If the computer hosts remote access, such as for remote support and system administration, a server package is downloaded. A Chromium-based browser that supports Chromium extensions such as Google Chrome or Microsoft Edge must be used. This is available for Microsoft Windows, macOS, Linux and ChromeOS.

The Chrome Remote Desktop allows a permanent, pre-authorized connection to a remote computer, designed to allow a user to connect to another one of their own machines remotely. In contrast, Remote Assistance is designed for short-lived remote connections, and requires an operator on the remote computer to participate in authentication, as remote assistance login is via PIN passwords generated by the remote host's human operator. This method of connection will also periodically block out the control from the connecting user, requiring the person on the host machine to click a button to "Continue sharing" with the connected client.

Under Windows, it supports copying and pasting across the two devices and real-time audio feed as well but lacks the option to disable sharing and transmission of the audio stream.

== See also ==
- Comparison of remote desktop software
- Remote Desktop Protocol
- Chromebook (ChromeOS)
