= AetherPal =

Remote access software

- Developer(s): AetherPal Inc.
- Operating system: Windows
- Type: Remote Administration Software
- License: Proprietary

AetherPal is a smart remote control that allows support staff to take control of any smartphone or pc anywhere in the world over an IP connection, as if the smartphone is in the hands of the support staff. AetherPal software is targeted for mobile operators and enterprises to provide customer care, technical support and remote training.

On February 5, 2019, it was announced that AetherPal would be acquired by VMware.

== Technology ==
AetherPal's smart remote control is built on multi tiered client server architecture consisting of following major components; smart phone client requiring support, browser based console for remote control management and high performance scalable server.

AetherPal uses SSL and TLS encryption to create a secure connection between the client device and the support staff. Once the connection is made, the device screen is replicated on the support staff's monitor and full real-time device emulation occurs. Streaming techniques are optimized to send only delta updates from the client, hence allowing efficient use of bandwidth. On top of this, the support staff are able to fine-tune the image size, color scale of the replicated image if needed. The session may be recorded enabling the end user client to take away a video issue resolution guide, unique to that device.

AetherPal enables remote control of multi-platforms and multiple instances from a single web GUI. A support representative may be connected to a smart phone such as Apple iPhone, Google Android, Nokia Symbian, RIM BlackBerry or Windows Mobile while also connected to a PC or Mac.

== History ==
On February 5, 2019 VMware announced its intent to purchase AetherPal.

== See also ==
- Comparison of remote desktop software
- Remote desktop software
