= Techinline =

Remote desktop application

Techinline FixMe.IT
- Developer: Techinline Ltd.
- Release: August 2007
- Stable release: 4.5.1 / May 24, 2018; 8 years ago
- Operating system: Windows
- Type: Remote desktop software
- License: Proprietary
- Website: https://www.techinline.com

Techinline FixMe.IT is an application for remote support, remote control, desktop sharing, remote training, and file transfer between computers. The application operates with the Microsoft Windows operating system.

== Product ==
How it works

FixMe.IT offers two desktop applications: Expert and Client. To start a new remote support session, the expert directs a remote user to the FixMe.IT website in order to download the Client application and obtain a unique session ID. The expert can then use the ID provided by the remote user to connect to their computer via the Expert application.

Features

FixMe.IT can be used to access both on-demand and unattended machines

The local expert can chat with the remote client, view and control the client’s desktop.

The expert may reboot the remote machine and the connection will be restored automatically.

Files can be transferred between machines by means of copy-and-paste and drag-and-drop methods.

The application can be integrated into any website, and the interface can be customized by adding a company logo, text, and fonts.

Other features include session recording, reporting, and multi-monitor support.

Licensing policy

Techinline FixMe.IT is commercial software that uses a subscription-based licensing model. Two types of subscription plans are available: monthly or yearly. Both plans allow an unlimited number of concurrent sessions and access up to 150 unattended computers.

== See also ==
- Comparison of remote desktop software
- Remote desktop software
