= Oracle Enterprise Manager =

Computer management tools

Oracle Enterprise Manager (OEM) is a set of web-based tools aimed at managing software and hardware produced by Oracle Corporation as well as by some non-Oracle entities.

== Releases ==
Oracle Enterprise Manager includes three releases:

=== Oracle Enterprise Manager Database Control ===
Oracle Enterprise Manager Database Control, the oldest and arguably the best-known release, aims to manage Oracle databases. It originated as a Java client able to configure and manage databases.

=== Oracle Enterprise Manager Application Server Control ===
Oracle Application Server also has a web-interface to manage the application server.

=== Oracle Enterprise Manager Grid Control ===
To manage many databases and application servers (according to Oracle Corporation, preferably in a grid solution), the Oracle Enterprise Manager Grid Control can be used. It can manage multiple instances of Oracle deployment platforms; the most recent edition also allows for management and monitoring of other platforms such as Microsoft .NET, Microsoft SQL Server, NetApp filers, BEA Weblogic and others. Partners and IT organizations can build extensions to Oracle Enterprise Manager, and make them available to other Enterprise Manager users via an Oracle hosted web site called Oracle Enterprise Manager Extensibility Exchange.

System monitoring features include monitoring functionality that supports detection and notification of impending IT problems. It monitors Oracle Database instances, Oracle Real Application Clusters, and Oracle Application Server Farms and Clusters. OEM Grid Control comes with a set of performance and health metrics that allow monitoring of technology components such as applications, application servers, databases, as well as the back-end components on which they rely, such as hosts, operating systems and storage.

The architecture of the OEM for Grid Control has three distinct components:

1. the collection agent (Oracle Management Agent or OMA)
2. the aggregation agent (Oracle Management Server or OMS)
3. the repository agent (Oracle Management Repository or OMR)

The OMA runs on the target host and collects information on the hardware, operating system, and applications that run on the target. The OMS runs on one or two servers and collects the data generated by the OMAs. The OMS pulls the information from the OMAs and aggregates the collections into the repository. The OMS also acts as the user-interface — by generating web-pages for database administrators to view the status of systems and services. The OMR comprises an instance of the Oracle database that stores the data collected by the OMS. Installers can make the OMR highly available or fault-tolerant by running it on an Oracle RAC instance across multiple nodes.

Plug-ins on each of the OMAs can customise or manipulate the data presented by the OEM by extending the data that the OMAs collect. Administrators can customize the analysis of the data with "management packs" to look at specific collections of data to display a system's performance. The current release of OEM allows for the design and configuration of custom Plug-ins to monitor any application desired. OMAs collect the data using the custom-built plug-in and transmit the results in XML format back to the OMS, which then stores and analyzes the data as desired. Oracle Enterprise Manager continues to expand its monitoring scope by offering management plug-ins for non-Oracle components, that are both Oracle-developed and developed in partnership by third-party vendors. For example, Plug-ins for Veritas Storage Foundation, VMWare vSphere, and EMC Clariion are available.

Key features of OEM Grid Control:

- System Monitoring
- Managing Groups
- Job System
- Information Publisher
- Compliance Management
- Extending Enterprise Manager
- Managing Targets

=== Oracle Enterprise Manager Cloud Control ===
This is Oracle's release since 13c

== Functionality ==
Oracle Enterprise Manager performs much of its activity through intelligent agents which Oracle Corporation refers to as Oracle Management Agents. These run as autonomous proxy processes on a managed node, and perform execution and monitoring tasks for Oracle Enterprise Manager, communicating using the Hypertext Transfer Protocol (HTTP or HTTPS). By default, upon installation, the OMA enables several packs (Change Management, Performance & Tuning, Diagnostics and Configuration Management) without any regard to what a customer has licensed. Users need to de-select unlicensed packs after installing the agent on a target database.

== Implementation ==
OEM uses by default the SYSMAN schema in an Oracle database as a super-administrator account/repository. Utility programs such as emctl or emdctl carry out actual functions. OEM also provides a command-line alternative, EMCLI (EM command line interface) with verbs to provide the same functionality as the UI-based EM.

== Components ==
The Oracle Management Server (OMS) is a software system that functions as a middle tier between Oracle intelligent agents and Oracle management consoles. The system may operate on multiple nodes and by default uses a schema named DBSNMP. Through this system, database administrators may view and control their OEM domain(s).

An OMS has special links with a repository database, used for storing OEM details.

== Version history ==
- Oracle Enterprise Manager Cloud Control 13c Release 5 (13.5) - April 2021
- Oracle Enterprise Manager Cloud Control 13c Release 4 (13.4) - January 2020
- Oracle Enterprise Manager Cloud Control 13c Release 3 (13.3) - July 2018
- Oracle Enterprise Manager Cloud Control 13c Release 2 (13.2) - October 2016
- Enterprise Manager 13c Release 1 (13.1) - December 2015 - ... support for Oracle applications, databases, middleware, hardware and engineered systems
- Enterprise Manager 12c (12.1.0.2) - November 2011 - In this edition, Oracle stressed hybrid environments, labeling the release 'Total Cloud Control', included the cloud-oriented Oracle Enterprise Manager Cloud Control.
- Enterprise Manager 11g - June 2010 - In this edition, Oracle used the term 'grid' that they had been using to describe the concept that eventually became more popularly known as 'cloud'. The release was labeled 'Grid Control'
- Enterprise Manager 10g Release 1 - March 2004 -
- Enterprise Manager 9i - June 2001 -

== See also ==
- IBM Director
- System Center Operations Manager
