= Timbuktu (software) =

Remote control software product

- Developer: Arris Group
- Stable release: 8.8.5/9.0.5 / October 19, 2013; 13 years ago
- Operating system: Mac OS X, Microsoft Windows
- Type: Remote control software
- License: Proprietary
- Website: Arris Discontinued Products

Timbuktu is a discontinued remote control software product originally developed by WOS Data Systems. Remote control software allows a user to control another computer across the local network or the Internet, viewing its screen and using its keyboard and mouse as though sitting in front of it. Timbuktu is compatible with computers running both Mac OS X and Windows.

== History ==
Timbuktu was first developed in the late 1980s as a Macintosh product by WOS DataSystems and a version was later developed to run on Microsoft Windows. WOS Data Systems was purchased by Farallon Computing in July 1988. Farallon was renamed Netopia in 1999 and the company was acquired by Motorola in February 2007. Timbuktu's primary function is remote control, and the application has support for various remote-control features such as multiple displays, screen-scaling, remote screen and keyboard lockout, clipboard synchronization and "on the fly" color-depth reduction for enhanced speed.

In addition to the remote control features (screen-sharing), Timbuktu also allows for file transfers, system profiling, voice and text chat, and remote activity notifications. Timbuktu versions 5.1 and earlier initiate connections over UDP port 407, though versions 5.2 and later use TCP port 407. The program has integrated support for Secure Shell (SSH) tunneling for those who require additional security. Both the Mac and Windows versions can use a standalone user database or integrate with the respective platform's "standard" user database (OpenDirectory on the Mac, and Active Directory or NT Users on Windows). The 8.6 version, released in March 2006, added an optional integration with Skype to enable a user to remote-control any of their Skype contacts who have Timbuktu installed. Starting with the 8.6 version, Timbuktu has been released as a Universal Binary supporting both Intel and PowerPC-based Macs. The 8.8 version, released in September 2009, added support for Mac OS X v10.6, although the ability to receive clicks with modifier keys broke with the release of Mac OS X v10.6.3 (March 2010). Version 8.8.2, released in November 2010, resolved the Control session mouse-click modifier key issues as well as Exchange connection performance issues. Version 8.8.3, released in 2011, made Timbuktu compatible with Mac OS X Lion. Version 8.8.4, released in 2012, made Timbuktu compatible with Mac OS X Mountain Lion, resolving a screen rendering issue. Version 8.8.5 for Mac, released in October 2013, made Timbuktu compatible with Mac OS X 10.9 "Mavericks".

Timbuktu for Windows v8.x is not compatible with Windows Vista, Windows 7 or Windows Server 2008, and feature-wise it lags well behind the Mac client from the standpoint of acting as a remote client (host-wise, it is identical). Motorola announced in mid-2009 that Timbuktu v9.0 would be released for "early preview" in Q4 2009, featuring full Windows Vista/Windows 7/Windows Server 2008 compatibility for selected customers and v9.0 was released in early 2011, with minor bugfix updates since. Version 9.1 for Windows apparently made it to pre-beta testing but was never released.

== Discontinuation ==
On April 28, 2015, Arris, the current vendor of the Timbuktu line, announced in an email to customers that development of Timbuktu was ending, and sales would be ended in 90 days. Technical support would be provided for five more years. The software is now listed among the company's discontinued products, in the "Remote Access Software" category.

== See also ==
- Comparison of remote desktop software
