= ThinLinc =

Remote desktop server

- ThinLinc on Windows 11 with a GNOME 3 desktop
- Developer: Cendio AB
- Release: March 11, 2003; 23 years ago
- Stable release: 4.21.0 / August 21, 2026; 0 days ago
- Operating system: Linux, macOS, Windows
- Platform: IA-32, x86-64, ARM
- Available in: Brazilian Portuguese, English, Dutch, French, German, Italian, Russian, Spanish, Swedish, and Turkish
- Type: Remote desktop software
- License: Proprietary
- Website: www.cendio.com/thinlinc/what-is-thinlinc

ThinLinc is a cross-platform remote desktop server developed by Cendio AB. The server software and the users' main desktops run on Linux. Clients are available for Linux, Windows, macOS, and a number of thin clients. A browser client (Web Access) using HTML5 technologies is also available.

== Protocols ==
ThinLinc uses SSH for transport encryption and authentication, and VNC for graphics, keyboard and mouse. Access to client devices is provided through different open protocols such as PulseAudio for sound (playback and recording), NFS for file system access (using a user space NFS server), and Telnet/RFC2217 for serial port access. Access to a client-side Smart Cards is provided via the PC/SC interface using a proprietary protocol.

== High performance graphics ==
Starting with version 3.0.0, JPEG compression and decompression has been accelerated using the SIMD extensions present in modern CPUs. Given a reasonably fast server, client, and network, it is possible to play back motion graphics in full screen mode. This can be done without any client side video decoder software or specialized handling of video. These performance enhancements also means that ThinLinc works very well in conjunction with the VirtualGL software, which provides hardware accelerated OpenGL on the server side. This allows 3D applications such as Google Earth to run with good performance. For example, the National Supercomputer Centre in Sweden (NSC) is using ThinLinc to run applications in their cluster remotely.

== Usage ==
Many universities use ThinLinc to make system administration more centralized or only to make remote access to their computer systems available for students and staff. Example: University of Manitoba, Universität Zürich, Institut für Mathematik, Danmarks Tekniske Universitet, Luleå University.

Other users are Saab Group, Volvo Cars and Karlstad Municipality.

Since Oracle announced that they will discontinue their development of Sun Ray, there has been a big interest to replace it with a ThinLinc solution.

The customers are generally organizations with extensive in-house knowledge of how to set up advanced computer systems, but partners resell the product as a part of a complete solution.

== Open source software ==
ThinLinc includes many components that are Free and open-source software and Cendio AB, the developer, is a driving force in many of those projects. Notable projects that are used are TigerVNC, noVNC, OpenSSH, and PulseAudio. Source code is provided in the same archives as the binary versions.

== See also ==
- Comparison of remote desktop software
