= Ericom Connect =

Ericom Connect is a remote access/application publishing solution produced by Ericom Software that provides secure, centrally managed access to physical or hosted desktops and applications running on Microsoft Windows and Linux systems.

== Product overview ==
Ericom Connect is desktop virtualization and application virtualization software that allows users to run applications remotely, without installing them on the local computer or device. The software is noted for its scalability, ease of deployment, and compatibility with any type of infrastructure, cloud or physical.

Ericom Connect uses AccessPad (native client for desktops), AccessToGo (native client for mobile), or AccessNow, one of the first HTML5 RDP solutions to support clientless access to Windows desktops and applications from any device with an HTML5-compatible browser, including Macintosh computers, mobile devices, and Google Chromebooks.

Other notable features include performance monitoring, built-in real-time analytics & BI, support for two-factor authentication (using RSA SecurID), multi-tenancy and multi-datacenter support via a single unified web interface, and a “Launch Simulation” feature that allows users to visualize and simulate actual step-by-step user processes directly from within the administration console.

In addition to scalability, by distributing configurations, logs, etc., across multiple servers there is no single point of failure, as can be the case if all configuration information is stored on one server.

== History ==
Ericom Connect was introduced in 2015. Ericom Connect is a successor to Ericom PowerTerm Web Connect. PowerTerm Web Connect used an architecture similar to what was then current with Citrix and VMWare, relying on a centralized SQL server, a connection broker, image management for different hypervisors, and a variety of clients. Ericom Connect uses a new grid architecture that provides more scalability, reliability, and flexibility than before.
