= Remmina =

Remote desktop software client for POSIX-based operating systems

- Original authors: Antenore Gatta and Giovanni Panozzo. Vic Lee (former)
- Developers: Antenore Gatta, Giovanni Panozzo and Allan Nordhøy
- Initial release: 8 October 2009; 16 years ago
- Stable release: 1.4.39 / 5 January 2025; 16 months ago
- Written in: C
- Platform: POSIX
- Available in: 28 languages
- List of languages Chinese (simplified), Chinese (traditional), Croatian, Czech, Danish, English, English (Australia), English (United Kingdom), Finnish, French, Hebrew, Hungarian, Indonesian, Italian, Japanese, Korean, Polish, Norwegian Bokmål, Portuguese (Brazil), Russian, Slovakian, Spanish, Swedish, Turkish, Ukrainian, Valencian
- Type: Remote desktop software
- License: GPL-2.0-or-later
- Website: remmina.org
- Repository: gitlab.com/Remmina/Remmina

Remmina is a free and open source remote desktop client for POSIX-based computer operating systems. It supports the Remote Desktop Protocol (RDP), VNC, NX, XDMCP, SPICE, X2Go and SSH protocols and uses FreeRDP as foundation.

== Packaging ==
Remmina is in the package repositories for Debian versions 6 (Squeeze) and later and for Ubuntu versions since 10.04 (Lucid Lynx). As of 11.04 (Natty Narwhal), it replaced tsclient as Ubuntu's default remote desktop client. The FreeBSD ports/package collection also contains it as a separate port and additional protocol-specific plugin ports.

== Use ==
A common use is to connect to Windows machines, to use servers and computers remotely via Remote Desktop Services, by system administrators and novice users.

== See also ==
- Comparison of remote desktop software
- Vinagre
