= NetSupport Manager =

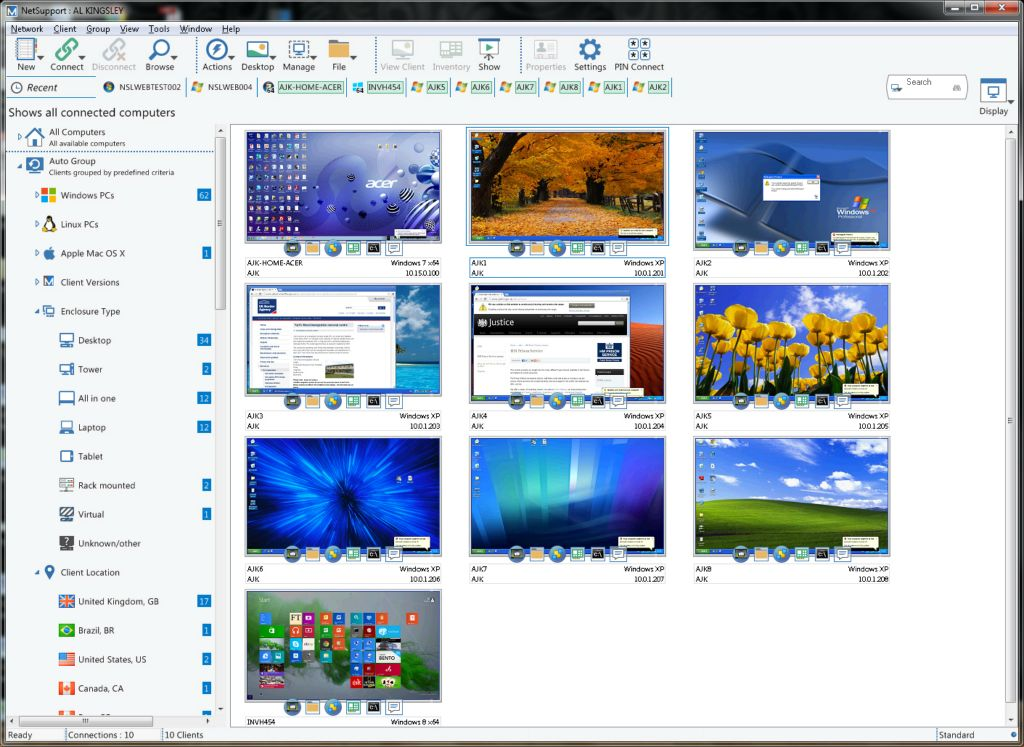
- Developer(s): NetSupport Limited
- Stable release: 12.80 / 2020
- Operating system: Android, iOS, Linux, OS X, Windows, Windows Phone
- Type: Remote administration software
- License: Proprietary
- Website: netsupportmanager.com

NetSupport Manager is a Windows-centric cross-platform remote control software, allowing remote screen control and systems management from a Windows or Windows Mobile device of Windows, Mac, Linux, Solaris and Mobile devices. It was first released for DOS only networks in 1989. It supports thumbnail display of unlimited remote systems (since version 10), and allows navigation between remote systems in a manner similar to a KVM switch. Functionality includes file transfers, chat, and hardware/software inventory including software updates. Fewer features are supported for Linux and Mac clients. In 2012 NetSupport introduced new software versions allowing Remote Control from iOS and Android tablets and smartphones as well as a new Mac OS Control. Version 12 was released in October 2013, which extended platform support to include ChromeOS clients. Mobile Remote Control from iOS and Android was also extended with additional capabilities. All versions of NetSupport Manager require the pre-installation of the software on both the local (Control) and remote (Client) computers/devices prior to use.

== See also ==
- Comparison of remote desktop software
