= Ericom Software =

American software company

Ericom Software, Inc.
- Company type: Private
- Industry: Software, IT
- Founded: 1993
- Founder: Eran Heyman
- Headquarters: Closter, New Jersey
- Key people: Eran Heyman (Executive Chairman); David Canellos (President & CEO); John Petersen (Chief Product Officer); Stewart J. Edelman (Chief Financial Officer); Nick Kael (Chief Technology Officer); Chase Cunningham (Chief Strategy Officer)
- Products: Secure Web Browsing, Server-Based Computing, Terminal Services Management, Remote Desktop Services Management, and Desktop Virtualization
- Subsidiaries: Ericom Software (UK) Ltd. (Droitwich, Worcestershire); Ericom Software Ltd. (Jerusalem, Israel)

Ericom Software, Inc. is a Closter, New Jersey–based company that provides web isolation and remote application access software to businesses.

== Overview ==
Ericom develops and sells remote browser-isolation technology, available as a cloud service or on-premises software. The company also sells a broad line of secure access products that connects users to enterprise applications and Windows environments. More recently, it launched a Secure Access Service Edge (SASE) platform called ZTEdge that includes network security capabilities like a cloud-based firewall, a web gateway, and other cloud security controls, as well as Remote Browser Isolation.

Ericom has been promoting the concept of Zero Trust Browsing, positioning its isolation technology as a way to safely browse the internet, prevent phishing attacks, and stop credential theft.

Ericom Blaze is also available as a Desktop Protocol (RDP) acceleration and compression technology to display content over a WAN (wide area network), high latency connections and networks with limited bandwidth. The solution accelerates RDP sessions accessed through a VMware View connection broker.

Ericom AccessNow has been deployed at schools to enable student and faculty access to Windows applications and desktops from Google Chromebooks. Ericom also has HTML5 clients for VMware View and Quest vWorkspace, AccessNow for VMware View and AccessNow for vWorkspace, running wholly within the browser, that enable seamless access to Quest vWorkspace and VMware View virtual desktops.

== History ==
Ericom Software was founded in 1993 by Eran Heyman, who was CEO until March 2015 and Executive Chairman until April 2023. Ericom initially developed Terminal emulation (IBM 5250, IBM 3270) products; later expanding to offer software for server-based computing, VDI, Web-to-Host Connectivity and secure browsing.

In November 2007, Ericom delivered the first Terminal Services client to be certified by Microsoft for Windows Server 2008.

Ericom AccessNow is a line of HTML5 Remote Desktop Protocol (RDP) clients that provide browser-based access to Windows applications and desktops running on Microsoft RDS/terminal services and VDI platforms from devices supporting an HTML5-compliant browser, including Google Chromebooks.

Ericom Connect is a remote desktop and application virtualization tool. Ericom Shield is a remote browser isolation solution that protects data security.

In January 2019, David Canellos joined the company as president and CEO. He said in an interview that he planned to focus on integrations with other technologies and vendors. In April 2019, the company announced that Nick Kael had joined as Chief Technology Officer. Kael is a cyber-security veteran and has held senior leadership positions at Zscaler, Symantec, BT, and Qwest. In February 2020, the company announced that John Peterson had joined as Chief Product Officer. Dr. Chase Cunningham joined Ericom from Forrester Research as Chief Strategy Officer in January 2021.

In April 2023, Cradlepoint, part of Ericsson, announced that it acquired Ericom Software to solidify their Secure Access Service Edge and zero trust offerings for hybrid 5G and wireline environments.
