= TightVNC =

Remote desktop software application

- Release: v1.0 / 2001; 25 years ago
- Stable release: Windows: 2.8.88 (19 June 2026; 2 months ago) Linux: 1.3.10 (6 March 2009; 17 years ago)
- Written in: C, C++, Java
- Operating system: Microsoft Windows, Linux
- Available in: English
- Type: Remote administration
- License: GPL-2.0-or-later
- Website: tightvnc.com

TightVNC is a free and open-source remote desktop software server and client application for Linux and Windows. A server for macOS is available under a commercial source code license only, without SDK or binary version provided. Constantin Kaplinsky developed TightVNC, using and extending the RFB protocol of Virtual Network Computing (VNC) to allow end-users to control another computer's screen remotely.

== Encodings ==
TightVNC uses so-called "tight encoding" of areas, which improves performance over low bandwidth connection. It is effectively a combination of the JPEG and zlib compression mechanisms. It is possible to watch videos and play DirectX games through TightVNC over a broadband connection, albeit at a low frame rate.

TightVNC includes many other common features of VNC derivatives, such as file transfer capability.

== Compatibility ==
TightVNC is cross-compatible with other client and server implementations of VNC; however, tight encoding is not supported by most other implementations, so it is necessary to use TightVNC at both ends to gain the full advantage of its enhancements.

Among notable enhancements are file transfers, support for the DemoForge DFMirage mirror driver (a type of virtual display driver) to detect screen updates (saves CPU time and increases the performance of TightVNC), ability to zoom the picture and automatic SSH tunneling on Unix.

Since the 2.0 beta, TightVNC supports auto scaling, which resizes the viewer window to the remote users desktop size, regardless of the resolution of the host computer.

TightVNC 1.3.10, released in March 2009, is the last version to support Linux/Unix. This version is still often used in guides to set up VNC for Linux.

== Derived software ==
=== RemoteVNC ===
RemoteVNC is a fork of the TightVNC project and adds automatic traversal of NAT and firewalls using Jingle. It requires a GMail account.

=== TightVNC Portable Edition ===
The developers have also produced a portable version of the software, available as both U3 and standalone downloads.

=== TurboVNC ===
TurboVNC is based on the TightVNC 1.3.x, xf4vnc, X.org, and TigerVNC code bases and includes numerous performance enhancements and features targeted at 3D and video workloads.

=== TigerVNC ===
TigerVNC is VNC server and client software, started as a fork of TightVNC in 2009, after three years of inactivity in TightVNC trunk. It also takes some code from TurboVNC.

== See also ==
- Comparison of remote desktop software
- RFB (protocol)
