= Parsec (software) =

Remote desktop application

- Original author: Parsec Gaming
- Developer: Unity Technologies
- Release: 2016; 10 years ago
- Written in: C, JavaScript
- Operating system: Microsoft Windows, macOS, Linux, Android
- License: Proprietary
- Website: parsec.app

Parsec is a proprietary remote desktop application primarily used for playing games through video streaming. Using Parsec, a user can stream video game footage through an Internet connection, allowing one to run a game on one computer but play it remotely through another device. Although its main focus is gaming, Parsec can also be used as low-latency desktop sharing software. The Parsec client is available on most modern operating systems including Windows, macOS, Android, Raspberry Pi 3 and Linux.

Parsec also provides a paid "Parsec for Teams" version with additional features for artists and developers, such as additional administrative tools, better color accuracy and the ability to stream multiple screens at once.

Parsec Warp adds additional settings, visual enhancements and more controls. The 4:4:4 mode makes colors sharper and crisper. Pen and tablet support has been added as well as the option to have extra displays.

In 2023, Parsec shut down its arcade system, which allowed users to share video games exclusively, similar to a multiplayer lobby.

== Partnerships ==
Parsec previously provided a simple user interface for provisioning and connecting to pre-configured virtual machines hosted by Amazon Web Services and Paperspace, this was removed and is no longer part of the current version. In January 2018, Parsec partnered with HP to create OMEN Game Stream, a free game streaming service based on Parsec's technology designed specifically for HP Omen PCs.

Unity Technologies announced its plan to acquire Parsec for $320 million in August 2021, with the deal expected to close by the third quarter of 2021. In September 2021, Unity incorporated Parsec's software into the Unity engine, to support development.

== See also ==
- Comparison of remote desktop software
