= Ammyy =

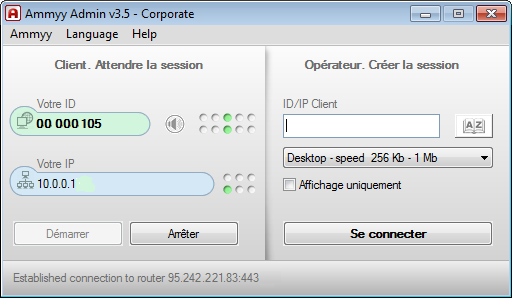
Screenshot of Ammyy Admin v3.5

Ammyy (sometimes called AMMYY) is a company which creates the remote desktop software called Ammyy Admin. It was often used by scammers who cold-call homes to try to gain access to their computer.

Since 2011 the company has issued warnings about these scammers who abuse their software against its intended purposes.

Ammy is a free of charge.

== See also ==
- Anyplace Control – Remote desktop application
- Event Viewer – Component of Microsoft's Windows NT operating system
