= GraphOn =

Application publishing software

GraphOn Corporation
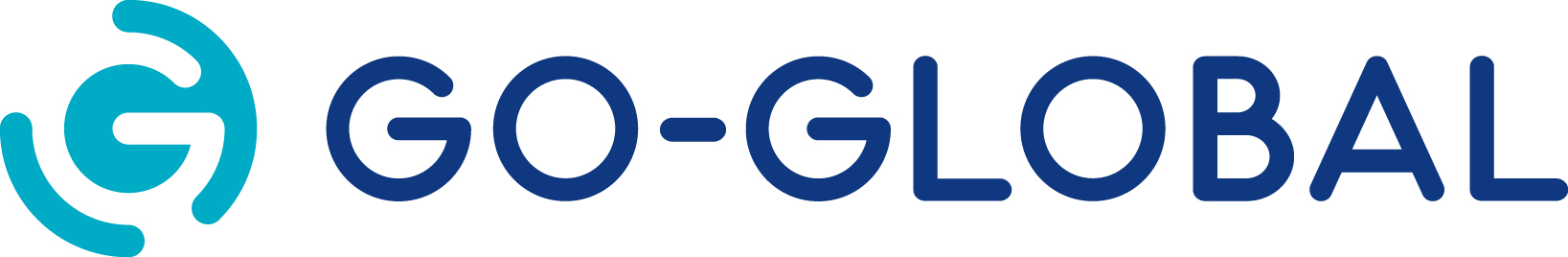
- GO-Global logo as of October 2020
- Type: Private
- Industry: Software
- Founded: 1982
- Headquarters: Concord, New Hampshire, United States
- Area served: Worldwide
- Products: Application Publishing Software
- Website: www.graphon.com

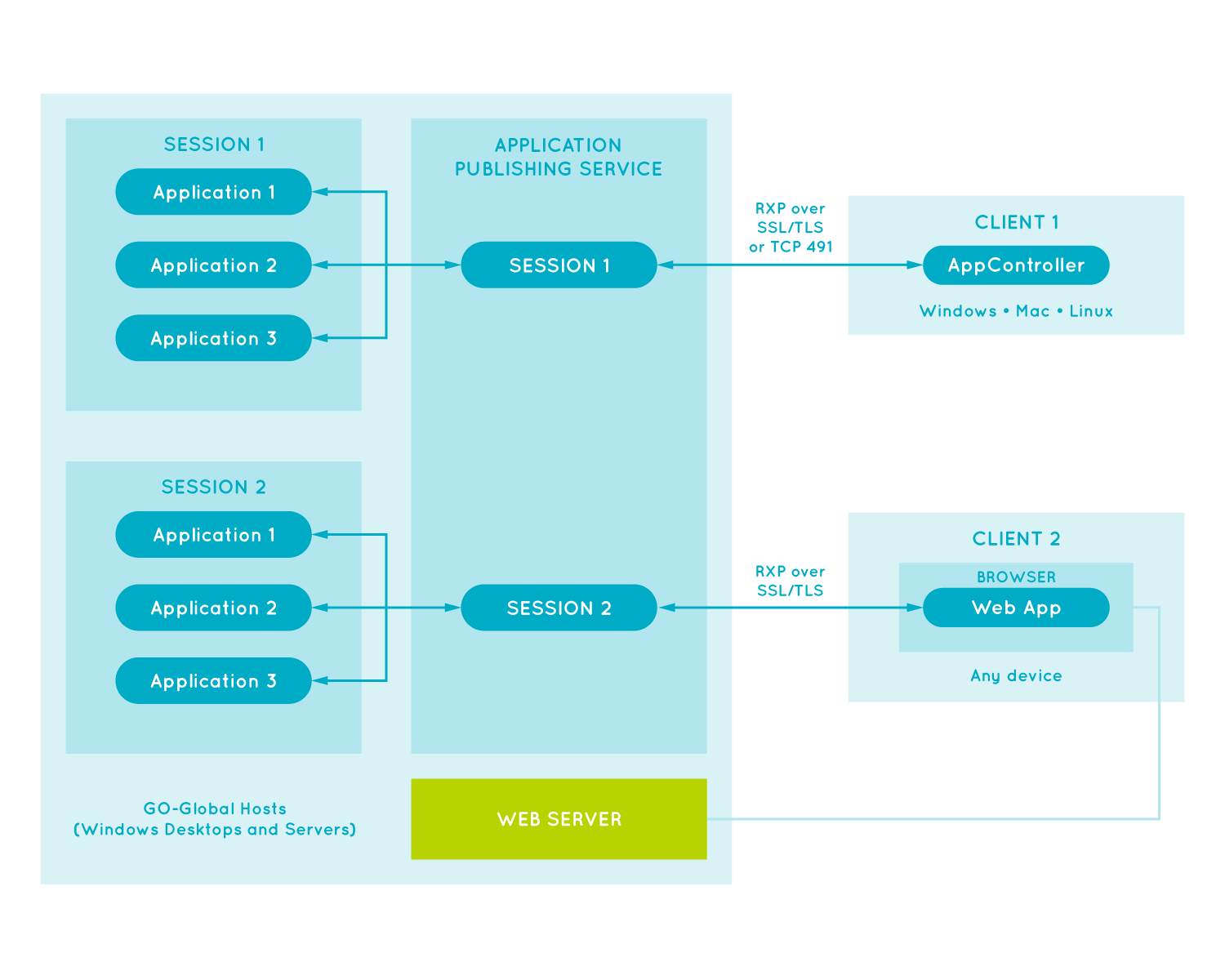
GO-Global Architecture

GraphOn GO-Global is a multi-user remote access application for Windows. GO-Global is a product of GraphOn Corporation.

GraphOn was founded in 1982 as a graphics hardware manufacturer. GraphOn changed its business focus to application publishing in 1996 and launched GO-Global in 1996. The company is headquartered in Concord, New Hampshire, USA.

== Overview ==
GO-Global allows multiple users to concurrently run Microsoft Windows applications installed on a Windows server or server farm from network-connected locations and devices. GO-Global redirects the user interface of Windows applications running on the Windows server to the display or browser on the user's device. Applications look and feel like they are running on the user's device. Supported end-user devices include Windows, Mac, and Linux personal computers, iOS and Android mobile devices, and Chromebooks.

GO-Global is used by Independent Software Vendors (ISVs), Hosted Service Providers (HSPs), and Managed Service Providers (MSPs) to publish Windows applications without modification of existing code for the use of local and remote users.

== Architecture ==
GO-Global enables multi-user remote access to Windows applications without the use of Microsoft Remote Desktop Services (RDS) or the multi-session kernel functionality built into Windows. GO-Global provides full replacements for Microsoft's multi-session functionality and its Remote Desktop clients, display driver, protocol, internet gateway, and management tools. GO-Global's architecture eliminates the need for RDS components to be installed on Windows desktops or servers.

== How GO-Global works ==
To access applications via GO-Global, users either start a locally installed GO-Global client or click on an administrator-supplied web link that downloads and runs the GO-Global HTML5 client in the user's browser. After starting up, the GO-Global client opens a connection to the Application Publishing Service (APS) on the host. The APS then creates the user session by calling the GO-Global System Extensions Driver (GGSE), which loads the Win32 subsystem, the GO-Global Virtual Display Driver, and the session-specific drivers. The APS then starts the session's logon.exe process, which prompts the user to sign in. After the user signs in, the logon process starts the requested application.

As the end user works in the published application, the application calls Windows OS modules (e.g., GDI32, User32, etc.) to perform various functions. GO-Global directs those calls to that session's instance of the Win32 subsystem. For graphics-related functions, for example, the Win32 subsystem will send graphics commands to the GO-Global Virtual Display Driver, which runs in the session's logon.exe process. The GO-Global Virtual Display Driver encodes the graphics commands in GraphOn's proprietary RapidX Protocol (RXP), queues the requests, and sends them via the APS to the GO-Global Web App, which executes the RXP commands and displays the session's applications in the browser.

== Security ==
By default, GO-Global encrypts sessions using DES (Data Encryption Standard) with 56-bit key strength for all client session connections to protect against basic packet sniffers and clients intercepting raw data communications. For internet communications and security-conscious environments, GO-Global offers SSL-based transport with the following encryption algorithms: 128-bit RC4, 168-bit 3DES and 256-bit AES.

Administrators using GO-Global can employ Third-Party Virtual Private Networking (VPN) software to create a secure, encrypted tunnel from the client device to GO-Global Hosts. The remote end user can launch GO-Global sessions through the VPN tunnel. When using a VPN, GO-Global's proprietary RXP does not need to be encrypted directly, although it can be for an extra level of security. When travelling through a VPN, it is encrypted by the VPN software.

GO-Global supports Proxy Server Tunneling, also known as HTTP Connect. This allows a user who accesses the internet via a web proxy server to connect to GO-Global Hosts on the internet.

GO-Global's Two-Factor Authentication (2FA) (also known as “2-step verification”) provides an extra layer of security by optionally requiring users to enter a 6-digit code from an authenticator app on a smart phone, in addition to their user name and password.

== Licensing ==
GO-Global licensing is based on concurrent users, and can be delivered via an on-premises license file or using the GraphOn cloud license service.

== See also ==
- Fat client
- NX technology
- Thin client
