= AnyDesk =

Remote desktop application

- Developer: AnyDesk Software GmbH

Stable release(s) [±]
- Windows: 9.8.3 / October 26, 2026; 23 days ago
- macOS: 9.8.1 / October 8, 2026; 41 days ago
- Android/Chrome OS: 9.0.2 / September 18, 2026; 2 months ago
- iOS (Note: Including iPadOS, visionOS and tvOS): 8.3 / October 7, 2026; 42 days ago
- Linux: 8.1 / September 23, 2026; 56 days ago
- Raspberry Pi: 8.1 / September 23, 2026; 56 days ago
- Free BSD, discontinued: 6.1.1 / April 15, 2021; 5 years ago
- Operating system: Windows XP+; macOS 11+; Windows Server 2003+; Linux; Android; iOS 15+ (Note: Including iPadOS and tvOS); visionOS 1+; Raspberry Pi
- Type: Remote desktop software, Remote administration, Remote support
- License: Proprietary software
- Website: anydesk.com

AnyDesk is a remote desktop application distributed by AnyDesk Software GmbH. The proprietary software program provides platform-independent remote access to personal computers and other devices running the host application. It offers remote control, file transfer, and VPN functionality. AnyDesk is often used in technical support scams and other remote access scams.

== Company ==
AnyDesk Software GmbH was founded in 2014 in Stuttgart, Germany and now has subsidiaries in the US, China, and Hong Kong, as well as an Innovation Hub in Georgia.

In May 2018, AnyDesk secured 6.5 million euros of funding in a Series A round led by EQT Ventures. Another round of investment in January 2020 brought AnyDesk to over twenty million dollars of combined funding.

== Controversy ==
Since the 2022 Russian invasion of Ukraine and the implementation of international sanctions, AnyDesk has maintained its operations in Russia. Some critics suggest that this decision could weaken the impact of sanctions and raises questions about the company's approach to corporate responsibility during conflicts.

== Software ==
AnyDesk uses the proprietary video codec "DeskRT". It is designed to allow users high-quality video and sound reception, and keep the amount of data transmitted to a minimum.

AnyDesk partnered with remote monitoring and management and mobile device management services, such as Atera Networks and Microsoft Intune.

=== Features ===
Availability of features is dependent upon the license of the individual user. Some main features include:

- Remote access for multiple operating systems (Windows, Linux, macOS, iOS, Android, etc.)
- File transfer and manager
- Remote print
- VPN
- Unattended access
- Whiteboard
- Auto-discovery (automatic analysis of local network)
- Chat function
- REST API
- Custom clients
- Session protocol
- Two-factor authentication
- Individual host server

== Security ==
AnyDesk uses TLS 1.2 with authenticated encryption. Every connection between AnyDesk clients is secured with AES-256. When a direct network connection can be established, the session is endpoint encrypted and its data is not routed through AnyDesk servers. Additionally, whitelisting of incoming connections is possible.

== Abuses ==
AnyDesk is one of many tools used in technical support scams and other remote access scams. It can be optionally installed on computers and smartphones with full administrative permissions, if the user chooses to do so. This provides the host user with full access to the guest computer over the Internet, and, like all remote desktop applications, is a severe security risk if connected to an untrusted host.

=== Mobile access fraud ===
In February 2019, Reserve Bank of India warned of an emerging digital banking fraud, explicitly mentioning AnyDesk as the attack channel. The general scam procedure is as follows: fraudsters get victims to download AnyDesk from the Google Play Store on their mobile phone, usually by mimicking the customer service of legitimate companies. Then, the scammers convince the victim to provide the nine-digit access code and to grant certain permissions. After permissions are obtained and if no other security measures are in place, the scammers usually transfer money using the Indian Unified Payment Interface. A similar scam took place in 2020, according to Kashmir Cyber police. The same method of theft is widely used internationally on either mobile phones or computers: a phone call convinces a person to allow connection to their device, typically from a caller claiming to be a service provider to "solve problems with the computer/phone", warning that Internet service will otherwise be disconnected, or from a caller claiming to be a financial institution because "there have been suspicious withdrawal attempts from your account".

=== Bundling with ransomware ===
In May 2018, the Japanese cybersecurity firm Trend Micro discovered that cybercriminals bundled a new ransomware variant with AnyDesk, possibly as an evasion tactic masking the true purpose of the ransomware while it performs its encryption routine.

=== Technical support scams ===
Scammers use AnyDesk and similar remote desktop software to obtain full access to the victims' computer by impersonating a technical support person. The victim is asked to download and install AnyDesk and provide the attackers with access. When access is obtained, the attackers can control the computer and move personal files and sensitive data.

In 2017, the UK based ISP TalkTalk banned TeamViewer and similar software from all its networks after scammers cold called victims and talked them into giving access to their computer. The software was removed from the blacklist after setting up a scam warning. In September 2021, the State Bank of India warned customers not to install AnyDesk or similar apps. In March 2022, the Federal Bureau of Investigation issued a cybersecurity advisory noting that AnyDesk software was used in the operations of the AvosLocker ransomware gang.

In 2023, AnyDesk announced the establishment of an "Anti-Fraud Task Force" in partnership with a number of prominent scam baiters in an initiative to combat technical support scams and abuse of remote-access software. The task force included Jim Browning, Kitboga and Scammer Payback.

== See also ==
- Comparison of remote desktop software
- Virtual Network Computing
