= X2x =

x2x
- Original author: David Chaiken
- Initial release: 1996
- Stable release: 1.30 / June 10, 2023; 3 years ago
- Written in: C
- Operating system: Unix-like, Cygwin
- Type: X window manager
- License: MIT/X11
- Website: x2x on GitHub
- Repository: github.com/dottedmag/x2x

x2x allows the console (keyboard and mouse) on one X server to be used to control another X server. It also provides ancillary functions like clipboard sharing.

The software was developed in 1996 by David Chaiken at DEC. It is currently maintained by Mikhail Gusarov.

The tool provided ideas used by x2vnc and Win2vnc. It is still in use to this day.

The name x2x has been registered as an international trademark by Triple-S GmbH of Germany for one of their software products despite the obvious prior use of the name.

== See also ==
- Comparison of remote desktop software
- Synergy
