= Systancia =

European cybersecurity software vendor

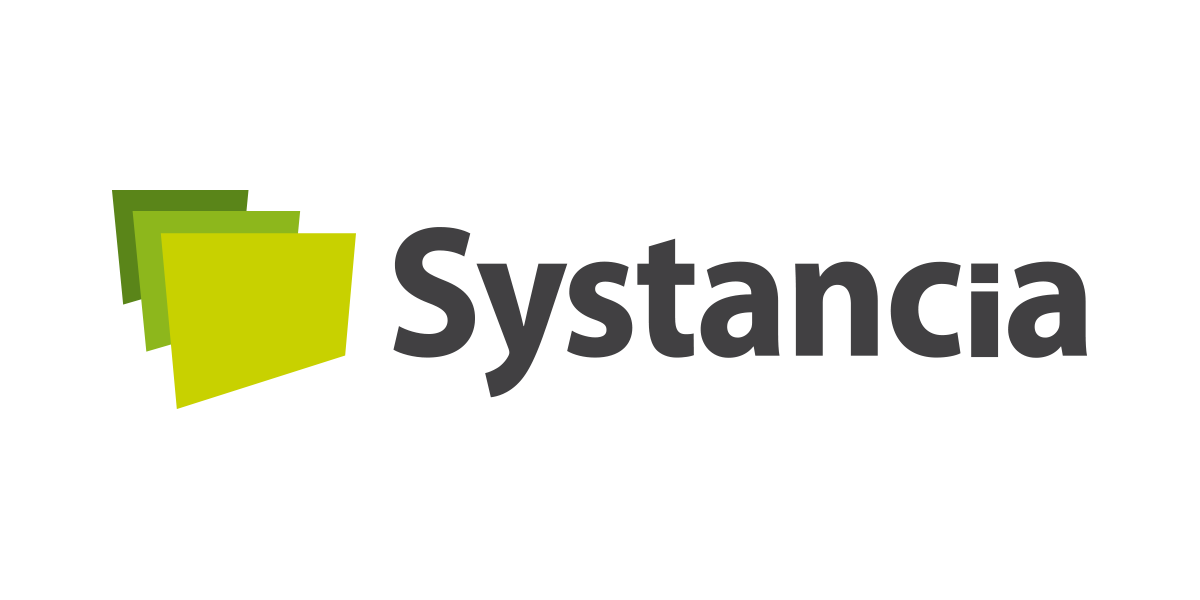
- Industry: Information Technology, Software
- Founded: 1998
- Founder: Christophe Corne
- Key people: Christophe Corne – CEO & Founder
- Products: Identity management, Zero trust security model, Secure access service edge, Desktop and Application Virtualization, Cloud Computing
- Number of employees: 100 - 500
- Website: www.systancia.com

Systancia is a European cybersecurity software vendor.

Systancia offers solutions to secure external access to systems, and to manage digital identities and authentication processes, as well as an AI-based behavioral biometric authentication platform called "Neomia Pulse".

== History ==
Systancia's earliest developments date back to 1998 with a product for application and desktop virtualization.

In March 2020, during the COVID-19 health crisis, Systancia offered its teleworking service free of charge and joined OVHCloud's OpenSolidarity initiative.

In 2021, Systancia launched its Neomia subsidiary, dedicated to Artificial intelligence.

In 2023, Systancia announced the launch of cyberelements.io, a SaaS Zero Trust platform that brings together all its PAM, ZTNA and IAM product technologies.
