= Proxy Networks, Inc. =

- Type: Private
- Industry: Software
- Founded: 2006
- Headquarters: Boston, Massachusetts
- Key people: CEO Andy Kim, CFO Michael de Anda, CTO Bob Paul, Ryan Gallager in Support
- Products: Remote desktop software
- Website: www.proxynetworks.com

Proxy Networks, Inc. is a software company that specializes in providing Remote desktop software and collaboration solutions for IT professionals, including technicians, network administrators, and IT managers. The company was established in 2006 following a venture capital-backed acquisition from Juniper Networks. Proxy Networks is headquartered in Boston, Massachusetts, and is led by chief executive officer Andy Kim.

== Software Editions ==
Proxy Networks, Inc. offers a series of remote control software products under the brand name PROXY Pro, which includes both on-premises and hosted solutions. The three primary editions are:

1. PROXY Pro P2P Edition: This edition enables direct peer-to-peer remote desktop access between computers. It includes the PROXY Pro Master (viewer), PROXY Pro Host (client), and the PROXY Pro Deployment Tool.
2. PROXY Pro RAS Edition (Remote Access Server): This edition is an on-premises solution that adds the Web Console, allowing users to access, manage, and control host machines from a browser. It is tailored for remote support and collaboration, offering configurable service management tools, screen recording, and reporting features.
3. PROXY Air: A hosted remote desktop service designed to eliminate the need for customers to manage an on-premises server.

As of November 16, 2022, the latest version of the software is v10.5 Hotfix #2.

== Company history ==
Proxy Networks' technology was originally developed by Funk Software, a company known for creating one of the first remote desktop support solutions for the Windows 3.1 platform in the early 1990s.

In 2005, Funk Software was acquired by Juniper Networks, a company that primarily focuses on network security.

In July 2006, with backing from de Anda Capital, Proxy Networks. was established to acquire the remote desktop software product line from Juniper Networks The proprietary software, later branded as "Proxy Pro," was already in use by numerous organizations, including Boeing, Fidelity Investments and the United States Secret Service.

== Product Distribution ==
Proxy Networks' products are available directly to customers in North America and through third-party vendors in Europe, Asia, Africa, the Middle East, South America, and Latin America.

== Version history ==
Version	Date	Update History
10.3 Hotfix 3	Nov 2020	Automatic Host grouping by IP address was limited to 4096 and is now relaxed to 16777215. Several bug fixes.
10.3 Hotfix 2	Sept 2020	Host for Mobile app now extends support to Chromebooks that work with Android apps. New "Next Monitor" cycle button introduced on connection windows. Several bug fixes.
10.3 Hotfix 1	June 2020	Host-side connection watermarks introduced, new Host Settings Updater Tool is released, bug fixes.
10.3	Mar 2020	Host for Mobile app (iOS and Android) is released.
10.2	Jan 2020	Host Watermarking. Utility to update Host settings via Gateway. Launch installed Master from Web Console.
10.1 Hotfix 2	May 2019	Allows port sharing (443) with IIS. Improved high DPI support. Host on Demand for Windows as EXE. Transfer files via Clipboard or Drag&Drop. Reverse Web Proxy Support.
10.1 Hotfix 1	April 2019	Introduced support for web proxies in front of the PROXY Pro server. Improved forward web proxy support.
10.1	Nov 2018	Installers fully support environments that are in TLS v1.2 only. Host on Demand.
10.0 Hotfix 3	Aug 2018	Fixed a bug whereby Host rejects Master credentials when configured correctly. Users of 80+ AD groups may not have been evaluated properly, this is now fixed.
10.0 Hotfix 2	July 2018	Various UI and reliability enhancements. Master now sorts machines appropriately by IP address. Better handling when the Host has no cursor.
10.0 Hotfix 1	April 2018	Various fixes. Server Configuration Check Utility introduced to help diagnose and fix configuration issues. Renaming from Private Cloud Edition to RAS for Remote Access Server.
10.0.0 FCS	Oct 2017	PROXY Pro 10 is released. Added hierarchical Host grouping, HTML5 playback window and multi-factor authentication via Microsoft Azure AD.
9.0.1 Hotfix 7	May 2018	Cursor calibration issue fixed when multiple monitors are using different resolutions and scales. Manage Visual Effects works more reliably. Latest OpenSSL libraries (v1.0.2o).
9.0.1 Hotfix 6	May 2017	Gateway handles multiple Master versions from v6 -> v9. Host Status Updating has been improved along with updates to the latest OpenSSL libraries (v1.0.2l).
9.0.1 Hotfix 5	April 2017	Gateway Server SSL support now restricts connections to TLS 1.2 only for enhanced security and compliance with industry best practices.
9.0.1 Hotfix 4	Dec 2016	The Host component received a significant performance improvement on Windows 10.
9.0.1 Hotfix 3	Nov 2016	Introduces support for Mac OS 10.2, Deployment Tool refreshes faster, latest available OpenSSL packages.
9.0.1 Hotfix 2	Aug 2016	Bug fixes. Clipboard transfer error fixed, Gateway Server memory leak fixed, Host installation error fixed.
9.0.1 Hotfix 1	May 2016	Added "Update Master Settings" to Deployment Tool, new OpenSSL library (1.0.2h).
9.0.1	Mar 2016	Added "Export Deployment Tool Settings", remote printing is now an optional component, added "Forms Authentication".
9.0.0	Dec 2015	Support for Windows 10, new Mac viewer and Mac client, overhauled remote printing, automatic reconnection upon unexpected disconnect or a reboot, export connection audit reports to XLS & CSV.
8.10.2 Hotfix 1	Aug 2015	Added "Filter" box to Master.
8.10.2	Feb 2015	Added Host on Demand for Mac, monitor output toggle buttons, automatic screen recording, automatic screen recording based on user launching connection.
8.10.1 Hotfix 4	Nov 2014	General bug fixes, updated OpenSSL library (1.0.1j).
8.10.1 Hotfix 3	Sept 2014	General bug fixes.
8.10.1 Hotfix 2	Sept 2014	General bug fixes, bug fixes to the iOS app, updated OpenSSL library (1.0.1i).
8.10.1 Hotfix 1	Aug 2014	PROXY Pro Remote Desktop App for iOS.
8.0.0	Jan 2012	Introduced Web Console, added new product, Private Cloud Edition.
7.0.5	Nov 2011	Bug fixes, performance enhancements.
7.0.4	Mar 2011	Added "Active Users List" to indicate identities of connected users, restart in Safe Mode w/Networking and connect while in stealth mode.
7.0.3	Dec 2010	Internal maintenance release.
7.0.2	Nov 2010	Bug fixes.
7.0.1	Jan 2010	Bug fixes, auto-scrolling in all directions in full screen mode.
7.0.0	Nov 2009	Support for Windows 7 and Server 2008, connect to Mac via VNC, Wake on LAN, Deployment Tool now discovers computers and OUs in AD.

== Clients ==
Proxy Networks has served a variety of high-profile clients, including:

- Boeing Co.
- Fidelity Investments
- U.S. Secret Service
- Kisco Senior Living
- U.S. Department of the Interior
- Hitachi
- Toyoda Gosei
- Colorado Rockies
