= Remote Utilities =

Remote desktop software

- Developer: Remote Utilities Pty (Cy) Ltd
- Stable release: 7.2.2.0 / October 30, 2023; 2 years ago
- Operating system: Microsoft Windows, iOS, MacOS, Linux, Android
- Type: Remote desktop software
- License: Freeware and Shareware
- Website: www.remoteutilities.com

Remote Utilities is a remote desktop software that allows a user to remotely control another computer through a proprietary protocol and see the remote computer's desktop, operate its keyboard and mouse.

The program utilizes the client-server model and consists of two primary components: the Host that is installed on the remote computer and the viewer that is installed on the local PC. Other modules include Agent, Remote Utilities Server (RU Server) and portable Viewer.

== Feature and architecture ==
Remote Utilities provides full control over the remote system and allows to view the remote computer without disrupting its user. The connection is established via an IP address or the Internet ID and it has an IP filtering system allowing to restrict access to only certain IP addresses.

It has the following connection modes:

- Full control
- View only
- File transfer
- Task manager
- Terminal
- Inventory manager
- RDP Integration
- Text chat
- Remote registry
- Screen recorder
- Execute
- Power control
- Send message
- Voice and Video chat
- Remote settings

The Internet-ID

The Internet-ID technology became available in Remote Utilities starting with version 5.0. It allows the user to bypass software and hardware firewalls and NAT devices when setting up a remote connection over the Internet.

Remote Utilities Agent

Remote Utilities Agent was introduced with the release of version 5.1 which works as a program module for spontaneous support that runs without installation and administrative privileges.

Remote Utilities Server

Remote Utilities Server (RU Server) is a program module which serves as a self-hosted replacement for Remote Utilities hosted relay servers. RU Server has been made available with Remote Utilities version 5.1 release. The most recent version of RU Server as of December 22, 2021 is version 3.1.0.0.

== History ==
The developer company Remote Utilities, formerly known as Usoris Systems was founded in 2009. The predecessor project, Remote Office Manager was started in 2004 and were available for free download and use from 2004 until early 2010. The current name, Remote Utilities, was given to version 4.3 in mid-2010 as part of a rebranding effort.

After version 4.3, Remote Utilities released version 5.0 in 2011 with a major update. On 27 April 2012 there was a minor update for version 5.2 which included new features, a free license, and an updated licensing model.

== Operating system support ==
Remote Utilities was initially developed for Microsoft Windows. It currently supports Windows, macOS (viewer only), Linux (viewer only), iOS (viewer only), Android (viewer only).

Remote Utilities has also developed applications for iOS and Android devices allowing users to control computers remotely with their phone.

== Reception ==
Following Remote Utilities's launch, the software received consecutive positive reviews in PC World by editors in 2011 and 2012. It was featured in TechRadar's best free remote desktop software in 2019.
