= MeshCentral =

Open-source device management software

- Original author: Ylian Saint-Hilaire
- Developers: Community contributors, Simon Smith (maintainer)
- Release: 2007 (MeshCentral v1), June 16, 2017 (MeshCentral, current)
- Stable release: 1.2.5 / August 12, 2026
- Written in: Server: JavaScript (Node.js) MeshAgent: C, JavaScript (DukTape) MeshCentral Agent for Android: Kotlin
- Operating system: Windows, Linux, macOS, FreeBSD (MeshAgent); Android (MeshCentral Agent for Android)
- License: Apache-2.0
- Website: meshcentral.com
- Repository: github.com/Ylianst/MeshCentral

MeshCentral is an open-source remote administration tool originally developed by Yilan Saint-Hilaire. It provides remote control, hardware and software inventory, system monitoring, and background management including remote terminal and file management. It can also integrate with Intel Active Management Technology (AMT) to provide out-of-band management. Use cases include providing IT support and managed services. It can also be used for managing a set of devices in an Internet of things deployment.

The open-source remote monitoring and management tool TacticalRMM uses MeshCentral to power its remote desktop, terminal, and file management features.

== History ==
MeshCentral was originally designed in 2010. This version is now known as MeshCentral v1. In 2017, MeshCentral was rewritten to make use of more modern technologies including Node.js, WebSockets, and WebRTC. Until 2022, Intel was a significant sponsor of the MeshCentral project.

== Abuse by threat actors ==
Due to it being an open-source project, MeshCentral and its MeshAgent are occasionally abused by threat actors, including state-sponsored advanced persistent threats (APTs), as a remote access trojan (RAT) or botnet.

== See also ==
- Remote monitoring and management
- Mobile device management
- IT service management
