= Veyon =

Free and open source computer monitoring software

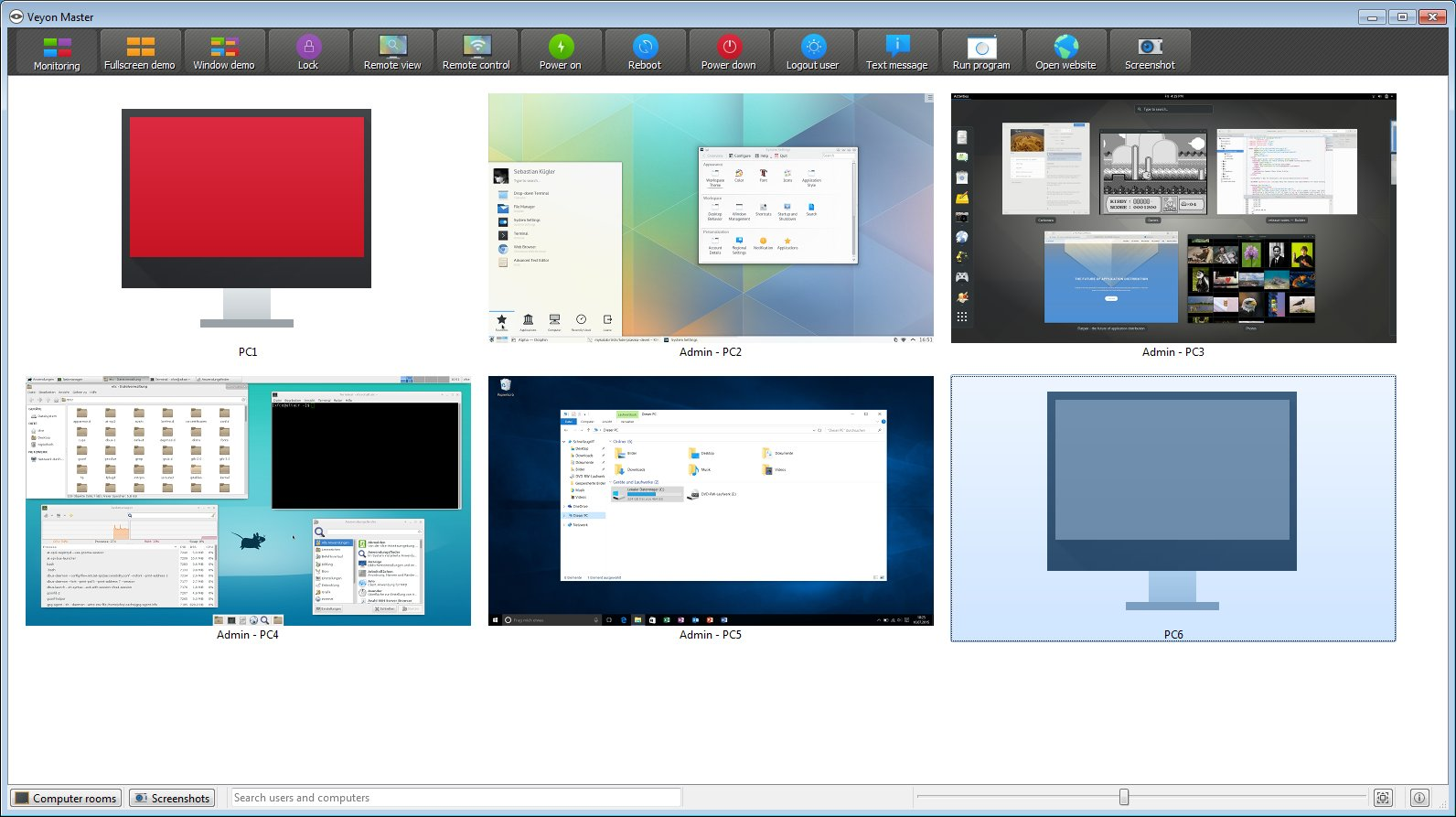
- Original author: Tobias Junghans
- Developer: Veyon Solutions
- Initial release: March 22, 2007
- Stable release: 4.7.3 (April 8, 2022; 4 years ago) [±]
- Written in: C++
- Operating system: Linux, Windows
- Size: Windows: 12.0 MB; Linux: 1.7 MB
- Available in: English, German and others
- Type: Software
- License: GPL-2.0-or-later
- Website: veyon.io
- Repository: github.com/veyon/veyon

Veyon (Virtual Eye On Networks), formerly named iTALC (Intelligent Teaching And Learning with Computers), is a free and open source software for monitoring and controlling computers across multiple platforms. Veyon supports users in teaching in digital learning environments, performing virtual trainings or giving remote support.

The program has been developed as a free alternative to commercial classroom management solutions. It enables teachers to view and control computer labs and interact with students. Veyon is available in many different languages and provides numerous features supporting teachers and administrators at their daily work. Veyon can be used transparently in heterogeneous environments. This means a teacher computer running Linux can easily access student computers running Windows and vice versa.

== History ==
The predecessor project iTALC was started in 2004 and initially available for Linux only. In 2006 and 2007 it was ported to Windows for the Sys-C project of the German city Chemnitz. The further development has been expedited among others through the integration into Univention Corporate Server @ school in 2010.

As part of the complete rehaul of iTALC in 2017 the software has been released under the new name Veyon. Veyon differs from its predecessor by a modular architecture as well as many new features such as access control via access control lists, LDAP server support and a new command line utility. Both administrators and users can now consult the new comprehensive administration and user manuals in many different languages.

== Technology ==
Veyon uses an extended version of the VNC protocol to communicate with remote computers and uses UltraVNC. Since Veyon is based on TCP connections, broadcasting screens also works across local network boundaries. Fast and efficient compression algorithms even allow connecting private student computers at home.

The Veyon Service needs to be installed on all student computers. The service can't be stopped or uninstalled by students if they do not have administrative privileges. The Veyon Master application running on the teacher computer accesses the service on the student computers. Authentication is performed using RSA keys or by checking user credentials. This way it's ensured only teachers can access student computers.

== Features ==
Features of Veyon include the following:

- Overview: monitor all computers in one or multiple locations or classrooms
- Remote access: view or control computers to watch and support users
- Demo: broadcast the teacher's screen in real-time (full-screen/window)
- Screen lock: draw attention to what matters right now
- Communication: send text messages to students
- Start and end lessons: log in and log out users all at once
- Screenshots: record learning progress and document infringements
- Programs & websites: launch programs and open website URLs remotely
- Teaching material: distribute and open documents, images and videos easily
- Administration: power on/off and reboot computers remotely (Wake on LAN)

== Compatibility ==
Veyon is based on the Qt framework and is written in C++. It's therefore available for both Windows and Linux systems. Support for further platforms and operating systems is being worked on. The usage of Veyon in combination with Edubuntu or Skolelinux (Debian Edu) allows schools all over the world the operation of a free school network.
