= X2Go =

Remote desktop software for Linux

X2Go Client
- Original authors: Oleksandr Shneyder and Heinz-M. Graesing
- Developers: Michael DePaulo, Mike Gabriel, Mihai Moldovan, Oleksandr Shneyder, Juri Grabowski
- Stable release: 4.1.2.3 / June 29, 2023; 3 years ago
- Written in: C++
- Operating system: Linux, FreeBSD, macOS, Windows
- License: GPL-2.0-or-later
- Website: wiki.x2go.org
- Repository: https://code.x2go.org/gitweb?p=x2goclient.git

X2Go Server
- Original authors: Oleksandr Shneyder and Heinz-M. Graesing
- Developers: Michael DePaulo, Mike Gabriel, Mihai Moldovan, Oleksandr Shneyder, Juri Grabowski
- Stable release: 4.1.0.6 / August 17, 2023; 2 years ago
- Written in: Perl
- Operating system: Linux
- License: GPL-2.0-or-later
- Website: wiki.x2go.org
- Repository: code.x2go.org/gitweb?p=x2goserver.git

X2Go is open source remote desktop software for Linux that uses a modified NX 3 protocol. X2Go gives remote access to a Linux system's graphical user interface. It can also be used to access Windows systems through a proxy.

== Overview ==
Client packages can be run on OpenBSD, FreeBSD, Linux, macOS or Windows. Some Linux desktop environments require workarounds for compatibility, while some such as GNOME 3.12 and later may have no workarounds. Desktop environments that are always compatible with X2Go, without any workarounds, are XFCE, LXDE and MATE.

The server package must be installed on a Linux host.

The X2go project has been packaged for Fedora beginning with version F20 (2013).

It is also included in the official Ubuntu release starting from 17.04 and Debian Wheezy releases.

== See also ==
- Comparison of remote desktop software
