= Vinagre =

Remote desktop viewer software (VNC, RDP, SPICE) for GNOME

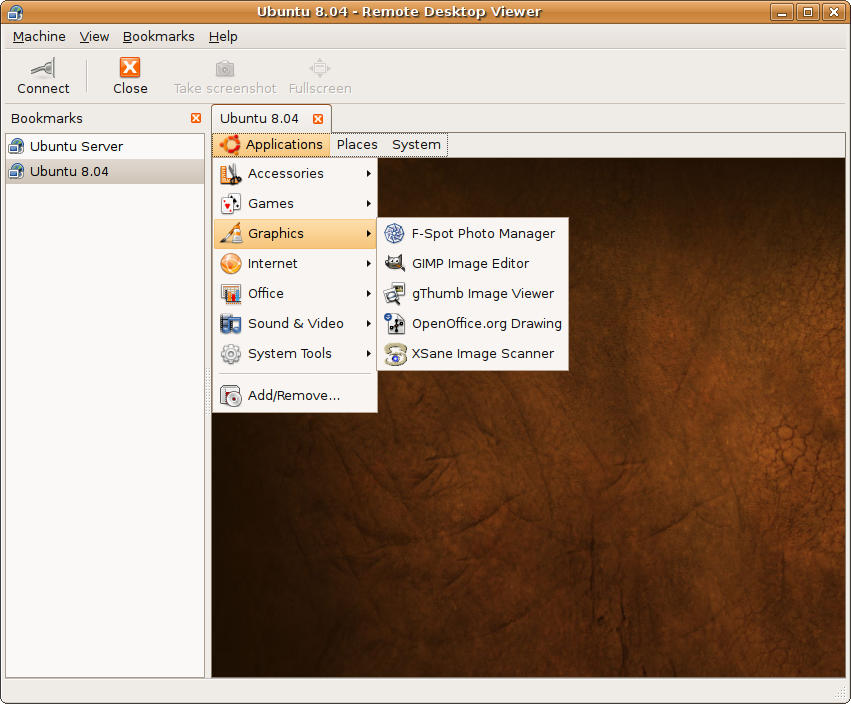
- Vinagre v0.4
- Developer: David King
- Release: September 17, 2007; 18 years ago
- Final release: 3.22 / 20 September 2016; 9 years ago
- Operating system: Unix-like
- Type: VNC client
- License: GPL-2.0-or-later
- Website: wiki.gnome.org/Apps/Vinagre
- Repository: gitlab.gnome.org/Archive/vinagre

Vinagre is a discontinued VNC, SSH, RDP and SPICE client for the GNOME desktop environment, superseded by GNOME Connections. Vinagre was included in GNOME 2.22. It has several features, like the ability to connect to multiple servers simultaneously and to switch between them using tabs, VNC servers browsing and bookmarking. In version 2.29, Vinagre added controlling frame compression, better scaling and color depth. Version 2.30 added improved SSH tunneling and better support for copy-paste features between client and server.

Vinagre version 3.0 will operate with GNOME 3.0. as of 2012, features such as frame rate, file transfer and audio support have yet to become available.

GNOME has included Vinagre in its default installation as its official VNC client, and it is the default program used for the Shared Desktop option offered by the Empathy instant-messaging client. Its default server is Vino.

As of 2012, Vinagre supports the ability to connect to Windows-based machines using RDP.

== See also ==
- Remmina
