= Anyplace Control =

Remote desktop application

- Developer(s): Anyplace Control Software
- Stable release: 7.7.0.0 / January 1, 2022; 3 years ago
- Operating system: Windows
- Available in: English, Russian, Spanish, German, French, Italian, Portuguese
- Type: Remote administration
- License: Shareware
- Website: anyplace-control.com

Anyplace Control is a Windows-based remote PC control product for remote access and control of remote PC located either in local network or in the Internet. It displays the remote computer's desktop on the screen of local PC, and allows control of that computer using the local mouse and keyboard.

The software has a file transfer feature to send files between computers. Remote users create an Access Password, username and password to access the target PC. The program must be installed at both computers, with client part of the software at the local PC.

== Features ==
- Remote PC control.
- File transfer between remote computers.
- Turn on, turn off or reboot the remote PC.
- Disabling of remote mouse, keyboard, monitor.
- Connection through routers, firewalls and dynamic IP addresses
- Display of a remote computer's desktop in a real-time mode on local screen.

== Licensing ==
The product is shareware available for private and corporate usage. Licenses are provided on a per Host or Admin module basis.
