= Proprietary protocol =

Communications protocol not documented by a publicly available standard

In telecommunications, a proprietary protocol is a communications protocol owned by a single organization or individual.

== Intellectual property rights and enforcement ==
Ownership by a single organization gives the owner the ability to place restrictions on the use of the protocol and to change the protocol unilaterally. Specifications for proprietary protocols may or may not be published, and implementations are not freely distributed. Proprietors may enforce restrictions through control of the intellectual property rights, for example, through enforcement of patent rights, and by keeping the protocol specification a trade secret. Some proprietary protocols strictly limit the right to create an implementation; others are widely implemented by entities that do not control the intellectual property, but subject to restrictions the owner of the intellectual property may seek to impose.

=== Examples ===
The Skype protocol is a proprietary protocol.

The Venturi Transport Protocol (VTP) is a patented proprietary protocol that is designed to replace TCP transparently in order to overcome perceived inefficiencies related to wireless data transport.

Microsoft Exchange Server protocols are proprietary open access protocols. The rights to develop and release protocols are held by Microsoft, but all technical details are free for access and implementation.

Microsoft developed a proprietary extension to the Kerberos network authentication protocol for the Windows 2000 operating system. The extensions made the protocol incompatible with implementations supporting the original standards, and this has raised concerns that this, along with the licensing restrictions, effectively denies products unable to conform to the standard access to a Windows 2000 Server using Kerberos.

== Effects of incompatibility ==
The use of proprietary instant messaging protocols meant that instant messaging networks were incompatible and people were unable to reach friends on other networks.

== Reverse engineering ==
Reverse engineering is the process of retrieving a protocol’s details from a software implementation of the specification. Methods of reverse-engineering a protocol include packet sniffing and binary decompilation and disassembly.

There are legal precedents when the reverse-engineering is aimed at interoperability of protocols. In the United States, the Digital Millennium Copyright Act grants a safe harbor to reverse engineer software for the purposes of interoperability with other software.

== See also ==
- Proprietary software
