= IBM Director =

IBM Systems Director is an element management system (EMS) (sometimes referred to as a "workgroup management system") first introduced by IBM in 1993 as NetFinity Manager. The software was originally written to run on OS/2 2.0. It has subsequently gone through a number of name changes in the interim. It was changed in 1996 to IBM PC SystemView. Later that same year, it was renamed to TME 10 NetFinity. The following year, it reverted to a slightly altered version of its original name: IBM Netfinity Manager (note the lowercase 'f').

In 1999, IBM announced Netfinity Director; a new product based on Tivoli IT Director. It was intended as a replacement for IBM Netfinity Manager. When IBM renamed its Netfinity line of enterprise servers to xSeries, the name was changed to IBM Director.

With the release of version 6.1, the product was renamed from IBM Director to IBM Systems Director.

IBM Director consists of 3 components: an agent, a console and a server. To take full advantage of IBM Director's capabilities, the IBM Director Agent must be installed on the monitored system. Inventory and management data are stored in an SQL database (Oracle, SQL Server, IBM DB2 Universal Database or PostgreSQL) which can be separate or on the same server where IBM Director Server resides. Smaller deployments can also utilize Microsoft Jet or MSDE. The server is configured and managed using the IBM Director Console from any Linux or Microsoft Windows workstation.

IBM Systems Director has been removed from marketing and is scheduled to reach end of service in April 2018.

== IBM Director is composed of these major tasks ==
- Asset ID
- BladeCenter Management
- CIM Browser
- Command Automation
- Configure SNMP Agent
- Data Capture Policy Manager
- Event Action Plans
- Event Log
- External Application Launch
- File Transfer
- Hardware Status
- Inventory
- JMX Browser
- Microsoft Cluster Browser
- Network Configuration
- Process Management
- Rack Manager
- Remote Control
- Remote Session
- Retail Peripheral Management (needs Retail Extensions)
- RMA Software Distribution
- Resource Monitors
- Scheduler
- Server Configuration Manager
- Service and Support Management
- SNMP Browser
- Software Distribution
- System Accounts
- Update Manager
- User Administration

== Major releases ==
- IBM Systems Director 6.3 (out of service)
- IBM Systems Director 6.2 (out of service)
- IBM Systems Director 6.1 (out of service)
- IBM Director 5.20.3 (out of service)
- IBM Director 5.20.2 (out of service)
- IBM Director 5.20.1 (out of service)
- IBM Director 5.20.0 (out of service)
- IBM Director 5.10.3 (out of service)
- IBM Director 5.10.2 (out of service)
- IBM Director 5.10.1 (out of service)
- IBM Director 5.10.0 (out of service)
- IBM Director 4.22 (out of service)
- IBM Director 4.21 (out of service)
- IBM Director 4.20 (out of service)
- IBM Director 4.12 (out of service)
- IBM Director 4.11 (out of service)
- IBM Director 4.10 (out of service)
- IBM Director 3.1.1 (out of service)

== See also ==
- IBM Systems Director Console for AIX
- System Center Operations Manager
- Oracle Enterprise Manager
