= Connection broker =

In software engineering, a connection broker is a resource manager that manages a pool of connections to connection-based resources such as databases or remote desktops, enabling rapid reuse of these connections by short-lived processes without the overhead of setting up a new connection each time.

Connection brokers are often used in systems using N-tier architectures.

A remote desktop connection broker is software that allows clients to access various types of server-hosted desktops and applications. In hosted desktop environments, the remote desktop connection broker is the “middle” component, in-between the desktops in the data center (hosted virtual machines, shared terminal server desktops, and blades) and the clients that are used to access the desktops (thin clients, soft clients, and mobile devices, among others).

Remote desktop connection brokers perform a variety of tasks, including:

- Checking user credentials.
- Assigning users to remote desktops.
- Turning remote desktops on and off as needed.
- Load balancing the servers that host the desktops.
- Managing desktop images.
- Redirecting multimedia processing to the client.
