= Remote support =

In information technology (IT), remote support tools are IT tools and software that enable an IT technician or a support representative to connect to a remote computer from their consoles via the Internet and work directly on the remote system. Although their main focus is the access to computers located anywhere in the world, the remote support applications also provide features like file transfer, desktop sharing, file synchronization, command line or guest accessibility.

== Privacy ==
Privacy is also a major concern for users. Some of the most-used tools in remote support sessions are those that allow desktop sharing. It is also possible to provide what is commonly called unattended support (the technician is granted total remote access to the client’s computer, even when he is not physically close to it). The need for an absolute trust in these services and providers is considered to be the biggest obstacle for this technology to achieve mass-marketing status – even when many studies indicate that for every 5 technical occurrences, 4 of them could be remotely solved.

== Benefits ==
Remote support technology aims to reduce costs for help-desk centres. For instance, transport-related expenses are immediately trimmed. Modern-day technology enables a technician using remote support to assist a customer as if they were physically side-by-side. Technologies and tools like live chat, VoIP and desktop sharing enable a direct intervention in the remote system.

== AR remote support ==
Augmented-reality (AR) remote support combines real-time video with spatial annotations (arrows, 3-D objects, highlights) that appear in the user’s field of view, enabling faster troubleshooting, hands-free guidance and reusable knowledge capture for maintenance, inspection and training.

=== Some service providers ===
- TeamViewer (TeamViewer Frontline / Pilot)
- VSight (VSight Remote)
- Microsoft Dynamics 365 Remote Assist
- AnyDesk
- Zoho Assist
