= Adaptive Internet Protocol =

Protocol allowing apps to run and display on many systems

Adaptive Internet Protocol (AIP) is a multi-channel protocol that allows an application running on any of multiple platforms to be displayed on any of a wide range of client systems. It supports rich remote display and input services with a number of display options to deliver the presentation of the remote applications onto the local display either as a standalone window, or within a contained remote environment delivered full-screen or in a standalone window. The protocol also supports audio, printing, and other device mapping services.

== Description ==
AIP provides a connection between the client system and remote applications via the Sun Secure Global Desktop Server. Clients exist for most versions of Windows (including handheld versions), and other operating systems such as Linux, Solaris and Mac OS X. The server runs on Solaris and Linux platforms; it listens by default on TCP ports 5307 or 3144 but can be configured to operate solely over a single port, usually 443, the so-called "Firewall Forwarding mode". The Secure Global Desktop Server additionally connects to back-end servers where the applications run using native display protocols such as RDP, ssh, X11, TN5250 or TN3270. These "application server" platforms can be Windows 2000 Server, Windows 2000 Advanced Server, Windows 2000 Datacenter Server and Windows Server 2003, or Windows client platforms that support RDP such as Windows XP and Windows Vista, as well as other operating systems such as Linux, Solaris, AIX, HP-UX and IBM application servers.

The protocol supports rich remote display and input services with a number of display options to deliver the presentation of the remote applications onto the local display alongside local applications using seamless windows, or self-contained remote environments delivered full-screen or in a standalone window. The protocol also supports audio, printing, and other device mapping services including drive mapping, serial port access, and clipboard mapping.

== Features ==
- 24-bit color support, giving a palette of 16.7 million colors (8-, 15-, and 16-bit color also supported)
- 256-bit encryption, using the AES encryption algorithm (this is the default security; older clients may use encryption of lesser strength.)
- Transport Layer Security support
- Audio - allows users to run an audio program on the remote servers and have the sound redirected to their local computer
- File System Redirection - allows users to use their local files on a remote desktop within the terminal session.
- Printer Redirection - allows users to use their local printer within the application session as they would with a locally or network shared printer
- Port Redirection - allows applications running within the terminal session to access local serial ports directly
- Clipboard can be shared between the remote computer and the local computer

== Advantages ==
AIP supports the remote display of a wide range of applications to the same client at the same time. The same protocol delivers applications running on UNIX, Windows and other platforms and the associated device services needed by these platforms. It can be configured in a firewall-friendly way (one port); the separation of virtual display layer from application layer provides for greater security and mobility. The Adaptive element of the protocol is driven by the dynamic monitoring of performance. Telemetry built into the protocol informs the server as to how best to communicate with the client and can change, for example, compression levels, packet coalescence, and packet pruning.

== Disadvantage ==
Expenses for the licence.

== Supported operating systems ==
The AIP or Sun Secure Global Desktop Server is supported on:

- Solaris 10 (SPARC and x86); Solaris 8 and 9 (SPARC only)
- Red Hat Enterprise Linux 4 and 5
- SUSE Linux Enterprise Server 10
- Fedora Core 6

== Default port and protocol ==
- Default port: 3144 or 5307
- Protocol type: TCP

== See also ==
- Microsoft Terminal Services
- Citrix XenApp
- Independent Computing Architecture
- rdesktop - free open source client for Unix platforms
- tsclient - free open source GUI frontend to rdesktop (Ubuntu, GNOME)
- Comparison of remote desktop software
