= Citrix Workspace =

Digital workspace software platform

- Developer: Citrix Systems
- License: Proprietary
- Website: citrix.com/products/citrix-workspace/

Citrix Workspace (formerly Citrix Workspace Suite) is a digital workspace software platform developed by Citrix Systems. Launched in 2018, it is Citrix Systems' flagship product. Citrix Workspace is an information retrieval service where users can access programs and files from a variety of sources through a central application or a Web browser. In addition to Citrix Virtual Apps and Desktops (formerly XenApp and XenDesktop), Citrix Workspace services include Citrix Endpoint Management (formerly XenMobile), Citrix Content Collaboration (formerly ShareFile), Citrix Access Control, microapp capabilities, usage analytics, and single sign-on capabilities to SaaS and Web apps.

Its central application, Citrix Workspace app (formerly Citrix Receiver), is client software that allows access to all of a user's files and apps from one interface. This includes mobile files and desktops, in addition to SaaS and virtual apps.

Citrix Workspace app replaced Citrix Receiver, which was the client component of Citrix products XenDesktop and XenApp, now Citrix Virtual Apps and Desktops. It was released initially in 2009; devices with Receiver installed were able to access full desktops via XenDesktop or individual applications via XenApp from a centralized host, such as a server or cloud infrastructure. The product's intended users were employees of businesses and organizations.
