= Mark B. Templeton =

American businessman

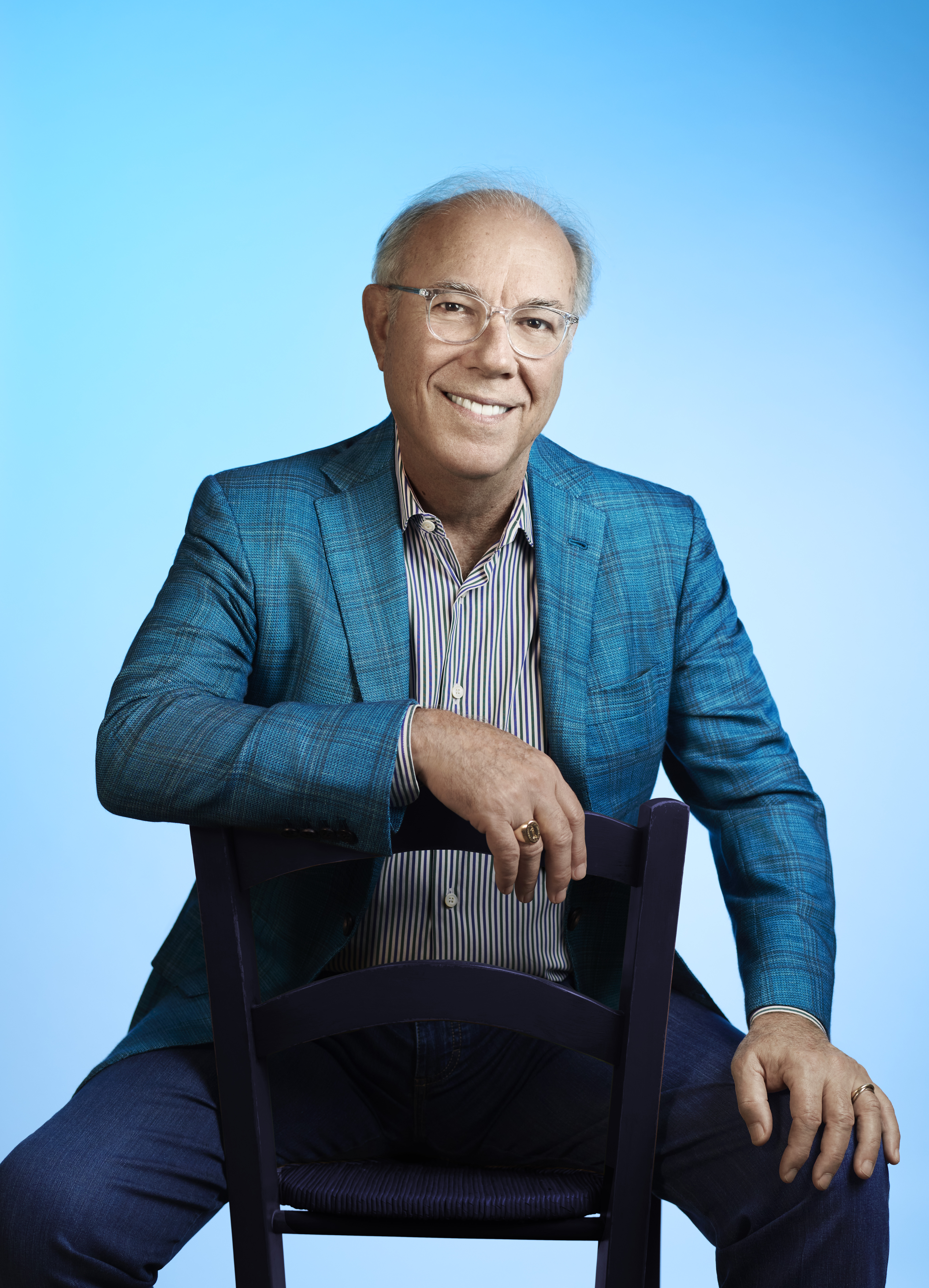
- Education: North Carolina State University; University of Virginia Darden School of Business
- Occupation: Business executive
- Known for: Former President and CEO of Citrix Systems

Mark B. Templeton is an American business executive, investor, and board director. He served as the president and CEO of Citrix Systems, Inc. from 2001 to 2015. He is best known for leading Citrix Systems, which he grew from a single-product business into a multibillion-dollar enterprise software company over nearly two decades.

== Early life and education ==
Templeton attended North Carolina State University, where he joined Lambda Chi Alpha fraternity. He initially studied engineering before leaving the university and later returning to its College of Design, where he graduated with a B.A. in product design in 1975. He earned an M.B.A. from the University of Virginia Darden School of Business in 1978. Templeton has credited design-led thinking as a defining influence on his later approach to product and company building.

== Career ==
=== Early career ===
Before joining Citrix, Templeton held leadership positions in the technology industry, including roles at LANSystems, Keyfile Corporation, Softblox and the UB Networks division of Tandem Computer. These early experiences provided him with expertise in enterprise software, product marketing, and emerging technology markets.

=== Citrix ===
Templeton joined Citrix in June 1995 as vice president of marketing, prior to the company's initial public offering. He was appointed president in January 1998 and chief executive officer in 2001. Templeton was first appointed chief executive officer in 1999. Amid an abrupt market downturn in 2000, the board temporarily reassigned executive leadership before reinstating him the following year.

In June 2001, Templeton resumed the role of Chief Executive Officer while continuing to serve as President. Under his leadership, Citrix transformed from a company focused primarily on remote application access into a global provider of virtualization, networking, collaboration, mobility, and software-as-a-service technologies. Citrix products during his tenure included XenApp, XenDesktop, NetScaler, GoToMeeting, GoToMyPC and ShareFile .

By the end of his tenure, Citrix had grown from roughly $15 million in annual revenue and a single product to more than $3 billion in annual revenue, about 10,000 employees, and more than 100 million users worldwide. During Templeton's tenure, Citrix expanded its global footprint and became one of the leading providers of enterprise digital workspace solutions. The company's technologies enabled secure remote access to applications and data, helping establish many of the foundations of modern hybrid and remote work environments. He envisioned an idea called “Virtual Workplace” that guided the Citrix strategy to allow people to work and play from anywhere.

Templeton served as both President and Chief Executive Officer until October 2015. His nearly two decades at Citrix are widely regarded as a transformative period in the company's history. In 2014, Citrix opened a redeveloped headquarters for the company’s ShareFile business in a former Dillon Supply warehouse in Raleigh, North Carolina, an early redevelopment project in the city's warehouse district.

In 2008, Templeton joined the board of directors of Equifax. He retired from the board in November 2018.

=== DigitalOcean ===
In June 2018, Templeton became Chief Executive Officer of DigitalOcean, a cloud computing company serving developers and businesses. He succeeded co-founder Ben Uretsky and was tasked with guiding the company's next phase of growth and operational scaling..

Templeton served as CEO until August 2019, stepping down for personal health reasons after appointing Yancey Spruill as his CEO successor.

=== 4Sense, Inc. ===
Templeton is co-founder and executive chairman of 4Sense, Inc., a technology company focused on human motion analytics and advanced sensing systems. The company operates at the intersection of data science, artificial intelligence, and physical-world motion tracking.

== Board Service ==
Templeton has served on the boards of public and private technology companies.

He has been a member of the board of directors of Arista Networks since June 2017

In January 2025 he joined the board of Proofpoint, a human and agent-centric security provider (owned by PE firm Thoma Bravo) to help the company's transition back to public markets. He also serves on the board of directors of Nutanix, an enterprise cloud, hyperconverged and sovereign AI infrastructure company.

His previous public company board service includes Citrix Systems, where he served as a director from 1998 to 2015; Equifax from 2008 to 2018; Keysight Technologies from 2015 to 2018; and Health Catalyst from 2020 to 2024. He has also served on the board of Adaptive Insights, later acquired by Workday, and, earlier, as chairman of Instart Logic, a digital experience and web security company.

As of 2026, Templeton serves as a founding advisor and investor in Cognitum One, an enterprise artificial intelligence company focused on sovereign agentic AI infrastructure.

== Political activity ==
Templeton contributed the maximum allowed by law to Jeb Bush's 2016 Presidential Campaign. In the past he has contributed to the Republican National Committee, John McCain, Hillary Clinton, Tim Mahoney, and Ron Klein.

== Personal life ==
Templeton and his wife, Yvonne, have three children. The family has resided in Gulf Stream, Florida.

== Awards and recognition ==
- AeA Abacus Award for Outstanding High-Tech Executive
- EVIE Award, "Businessperson of the Year"
- Excalibur Award, Sun-Sentinel Media Group
- Glassdoor "Highest Rated CEOs" (ranked No. 12 in 2013)
- Lambda Chi Alpha Order of Achievement
