= Citrix Cloud =

Cloud management service

- Developer(s): Citrix Systems
- Initial release: 20 August 2015; 9 years ago
- License: Proprietary
- Website: www.citrix.com/products/citrix-cloud

Citrix Cloud is a cloud management platform that allows organizations to deploy cloud-hosted desktops and apps to end users. It was developed by Citrix Systems and released in 2015.

== Overview ==
Citrix Cloud is a cloud-based platform for managing and deploying Citrix products and desktops and applications to end users using any type of cloud, whether public, private or hybrid, or on-premises hardware. The product supports cloud-based versions of every major Citrix product. These can be accessed together as an integrated "workspace" or independently.

== Features ==
Citrix Cloud enables cloud services for Citrix products XenApp, XenDesktop, XenMobile, ShareFile, and NetScaler. In addition, Citrix has developed several cloud-native services, including its Secure Browser Service.

Citrix Cloud is compatible with any device and cloud or data center and can be synced via Citrix Cloud Connector. As of May 2016, Citrix states that Microsoft Azure is its preferred cloud partner. Citrix platforms reside in Citrix Cloud, however other applications and resources may make use of other clouds and infrastructures. A company's IT department retains the ability to choose a custom combination of data centers and cloud providers. Citrix continuously updates Citrix Cloud so that users are automatically running the most current version.

As of 2015, Citrix Cloud offers four different service packages.

== History ==
Citrix Workspace Cloud was announced in May 2015 at the company's industry conference, Citrix Synergy. The offering launched in August 2015 with four core services: App and Desktop Service, Lifecycle Management, Secure Documents, and Mobility. The company positioned Workspace Cloud as an alternative to XenDesktop and XenApp, the company's traditional desktop and application virtualization platforms.

The company renamed Citrix Workspace Cloud to Citrix Cloud in May 2016.r In addition, cloud services were renamed with cloud-based versions of other Citrix products. XenDesktop and XenApp Service, ShareFile, and XenMobile Service replaced Desktop and App Service, Secure Documents Service, and Mobility Service, respectively. The company also announced in 2016 that Citrix Cloud users that are Windows 10 Enterprise customers would be able to access Windows 10 images on Azure via XenDesktop without having to pay an additional license fee.

== Reception ==
Prior to its release, Citrix Workspace Cloud was praised by desktop virtualization blogger Brian Madden for its concept and CMSWire noted that it stood out among competitors as the only product of its kind.

Following its release, TechTarget stated that the platform was "intriguing" that it "provide[s] something IT professionals have wanted for a very long time: centralized management of on-premises and cloud desktop and application workloads", but "also surprisingly expensive". A review in Computerworld suggested the hybrid nature of the product was compatible with the rising use of hybrid cloud implementations by businesses, but that Citrix would need to ensure "adequate support for critical applications and [make] sure that company policies, such as access rules, are followed properly".

== See also ==
- Amazon Web Services
- Microsoft Azure
- Oracle Cloud
