= DigitalOcean =

American cloud infrastructure provider

DigitalOcean Holdings, Inc.
- Trade name: DigitalOcean
- Type: Public
- Traded as: NYSE: DOCN; S&P 400 component
- Industry: Internet; Cloud computing
- Founded: June 24, 2011; 15 years ago
- Founders: Moisey Uretsky; Ben Uretsky; Jeff Carr; Alec Hartman; Mitch Wainer
- Headquarters: Broomfield, Colorado, U.S.
- Area served: Worldwide
- Key people: Paddy Srinivasan (CEO); Matt Steinfort (CFO)
- Brands: DigitalOcean; Cloudways; Paperspace; CSS-Tricks
- Services: Cloud infrastructure; Kubernetes; App platform; Virtual private cloud; Cloud firewalls; DNS; Managed databases; internet hosting service
- Revenue: ▲US$692.9 million (2023)
- Operating income: ▼US$−26.2 million (2022)
- Net income: ▲US$19.4 million (2023)
- Total assets: ▼US$1.82 billion (2022)
- Total equity: ▼US$51.1 million (2022)
- Number of employees: 1,204 (2022)
- ASN: 14061
- Website: www.digitalocean.com

DigitalOcean Holdings, Inc. is an American multinational technology company and cloud service provider. The company is headquartered in Broomfield, Colorado, US, with 15 globally distributed data centers. DigitalOcean provides developers, startups, and SMBs with cloud infrastructure-as-a-service platforms.

DigitalOcean also runs Hacktoberfest, a one-month-long celebration of open-source software held in October. Each year, it partners with different software companies, including GitHub, Twilio, Dev.to, Intel, Appwrite and Deep Source.

== History ==
In 2003, brothers Ben and Moisey Uretsky, who founded ServerStack, a managed hosting business, wanted to create a new product that would combine web hosting and virtual server and target entrepreneurial software developers.

In 2012, the Uretskys met co-founder Mitch Wainer following Wainer's response to a Craigslist job listing. The company launched their beta product in January 2012. In mid-2012, the founding team consisted of Ben Uretsky, Moisey Uretsky, Mitch Wainer, Jeff Carr, and Alec Hartman. DigitalOcean accepted the offer of TechStars 2012's startup accelerator in Boulder, Colorado, and the founders moved to Boulder to work on the product. At the end of the accelerator program in August 2012, the company had signed up 400 customers and launched around 10,000 cloud server instances. On January 16, 2018, new droplet (virtual machines) plans were introduced. In May 2018, the company announced the launch of its Kubernetes-based container service.

In June 2018, Mark Templeton, former CEO of Citrix, replaced co-founder Ben Uretsky as the company's CEO. In July 2019, Yancey Spruill, former CFO and COO of SendGrid (a fellow Techstars company), replaced Templeton as CEO. Bill Sorenson, former CFO of EnerNOC, was appointed as the company's new CFO. Spruill left DigitalOcean in February 2024.

In September 2021, DigitalOcean announced plans to acquire Nimbella, a serverless startup. In March 2022, the company acquired CSS-Tricks, a learning website for front-end developers.

In May 2022, the company released DigitalOcean Functions. Based on technology acquired from Nimbella and the open source Apache OpenWhisk project, DigitalOcean Functions is a serverless platform that allows developers to build and run applications without having to manage servers.

In August 2022, DigitalOcean acquired Cloudways, a Pakistani cloud hosting service provider, for $350 million in an all-cash deal.

In March 2025, Flexential announced a partnership with DigitalOcean to expand its GPU infrastructure. The partnership involves a phased deployment of high-density GPU servers at Flexential's Atlanta-Douglasville data center, aimed at supporting AI and machine learning workloads. This expansion is expected to provide additional GPU Droplets powered by NVIDIA H200 and AMD Instinct GPUs.

=== Growth ===
On January 15, 2013, DigitalOcean became one of the first cloud-hosting companies to offer SSD-based virtual machines. Following a TechCrunch review, which was syndicated by Hacker News, DigitalOcean saw a rapid increase in customers. In December 2013, DigitalOcean opened its first European data center, located in Amsterdam. In 2014, the company continued its expansion, opening new data centers in Singapore and London. In 2015 DigitalOcean expanded further with data centers in Toronto, Canada. and Frankfurt, Germany. Later in 2016, they continued expansion to Bangalore, India.

=== Funding ===
The company's seed funding was led by IA Ventures and raised US$3.2 million in July 2013. Its series A round of funding in March 2014, led by venture capitalist firm Andreessen Horowitz, raised US$37.2 million. In December 2014, DigitalOcean raised US$50 million in debt financing from Fortress Investment Group in the form of a five-year term loan. In July 2015, the company raised US$83 million in its series B round of funding led by Access Industries with participation from Andreessen Horowitz. In April 2016, the company secured US$130 million in credit financing to build out new cloud services. In May 2020, DigitalOcean raised an additional $50 million from Access Industries and Andreessen Horowitz.

On March 24, 2021, DigitalOcean became a publicly traded company on the New York Stock Exchange, with their initial public offering price at $47 per share. In March 2026, DigitalOcean upsized stock offering to $800 million to fund its AI and infrastructure growth.

=== Blocking in Iran and Russia ===
Digital Ocean was blocked throughout Iran as part of its attempt to cut off use of the Lantern internet censorship circumvention tool.

According to Russian law, any host keeping its citizens' personal data needs to be located in Russian territory. This law led to a temporary block in April 2018 of Google, Amazon, Azure, and DigitalOcean, among others, in Russia by Roskomnadzor as a hosting provider for Telegram Messenger and VPS services.

== Corporate affairs ==
=== Products and business model ===
DigitalOcean offers virtual private servers (VPS), or "droplets" using DigitalOcean terminology, using KVM as the hypervisor and can be created in various sizes (divided in two classes: standard and optimized), in 13 different data center regions (as of December 2020) and with various options out of the box, including six Linux distributions and dozens of one-click applications.

In early 2017, DigitalOcean expanded its feature set by adding load balancers to their offering. Their platform is an alternative cloud offering and the company targets smaller developers, allowing them to spend as little as five dollars on their platform.

DigitalOcean can be managed through a web interface or using doctl command line.

DigitalOcean also offers block and object-based storage and since May 2018 Kubernetes-based container service.

Reviewers have noted that DigitalOcean requires users to have some experience in sysadmin and DevOps. In his review for ScienceBlogs, writer Greg Laden warned: "DigitalOcean is not for everybody. You need to be at least a little savvy with Linux ... "

In 2021, DigitalOcean launched a managed MongoDB database service.

== DigitalOcean community ==
As of 2021, DigitalOcean is hosting publicly available community forums and tutorials on open source and system administration topics. As of August 2014, the service claimed to have over 1,000 vetted tutorials.

In 2017, in partnership with Stripe, DigitalOcean sponsored the Libscore tool to freely provide the developer community with open access to analytics on web development tools.

DigitalOcean Marketplace provides facilities to deploy various software bundles. Internally, it's run by DigitalOcean Kubernetes, OpenChannel for the catalog API and data warehouse and Cloudflare for CDN and load-balancing.

=== Hacktoberfest 2020 controversy ===
DigitalOcean was widely criticized for its role in creating a perverse incentive when it promoted Hacktoberfest 2020 with free t-shirts for contributions to open source projects, resulting in massive spurious pull requests on open source GitHub repositories, amounting to an unintentional "corporate-sponsored distributed denial of service attack against the open source maintainer community". DigitalOcean responded by issued updates to Hacktoberfest to help prevent this, by allowing open source maintainers to specifically opt into Hacktoberfest, updating the Hacktoberfest process to allow maintainers to mark content as spam, and preventing repositories set up just to game the system from participating.

=== Sponsorships and donations ===
In August 2026, DigitalOcean cancelled a $50/month sponsorship of private servers to GNOME and Flathub, as reported by the project's infrastructure engineer.

In September 2026, DigitalOcean announced a $3 Million contribution to the Omarchy project over the next 3 years.
