= AIP =

AIP may refer to:

== Arts, entertainment and media ==
- Action International Pictures
- Afghan Islamic Press
- AIP Records, a record label
- American International Pictures, an independent film production/distribution company, now a subsidiary of MGM
- Art Institute of Pittsburgh
- Artistic Infusion Program, a program of the United States Mint, established in 2003

== Aviation ==
- Aeronautical Information Publication
- Airport Improvement Program

== Medicine ==
- Aryl hydrocarbon receptor interacting protein
- Acute intermittent porphyria
- Acute interstitial pneumonitis, Hamman-Rich syndrome
- Autoimmune pancreatitis

== Non-profit organizations ==
- American Institute of Parliamentarians
- American Institute of Philanthropy
- American Institute of Physics
- Australian Institute of Physics

== Political organizations ==
- Alaskan Independence Party
- American Independent Party
- Azərbaycan İslam Partiyası, Azerbaijan Islamic Party

== Other uses ==
- Adaptive Internet Protocol, a protocol used by Sun Secure Global Desktop
- Agreement in principle, a stepping stone to a contract
- Air-independent propulsion, a technology used in submarines
- Air Injection Pump, a component of the air injection system of an engine
- American Industrial Partners. an American private equity partnership investing in industrial businesses
- Archival information package, a component of the Open Archival Information System model
- Arrow information paradox, whereby proprietary information loses market value once revealed
- Astrophysical Institute Potsdam

== See also ==
- Aluminium phosphide (AlP), with a lower-case L instead of an I
