= Ben Uretsky =

American information technology executive

Ben Uretsky is the cofounder and former chief executive officer (CEO) of DigitalOcean, a cloud infrastructure provider.

== Early life ==
Uretsky’s family immigrated to the U.S. from Russia when he was five. He grew up in Brighton Beach, Brooklyn and attended Stuyvesant High School.

== Career ==
In 2003 Uretsky founded his first company ServerStack, a managed hosting provider, with his brother Moisey Uretsky. The company was a precursor to DigitalOcean. Prior to starting ServerStack, Uretsky worked for another managed hosting company called Like Whoa.

In 2011, Uretsky founded DigitalOcean with his brother and another cofounder, Mitch Wainer. In 2012, Uretsky and the other cofounders graduated from the Techstars incubator program in Boulder, Colorado. They launched the first version of DigitalOcean’s product the same year.

In June 2018, Uretsky stepped down as CEO of DigitalOcean and was succeeded by former Citrix CEO Mark Templeton. He remained on the company’s board.
