= AVD =

AVD may refer to:

- A US Navy hull classification symbol: Destroyer seaplane tender (AVD)
- Alviri-Vidari language, an Iranian language (ISO 639-3 abbreviation)
- Apparent volume of distribution, distribution of a drug
- Aqueous vermiculite dispersion, a fire extinguisher medium specifically designed for suppressing fires in lithium-ion batteries
- Aromantic Visibility Day, annual day of awareness for people on the aromantic spectrum
- Assisted vaginal delivery
- Assisted voluntary death
- Audio, Video, Disco, 2011 album by the electronic music duo Justice
- Automobilclub von Deutschland, Germany's oldest automobile club
- Avadi railway station, Tamil Nadu, India (railroad station abbreviation)
- Azure Virtual Desktop, the DaaS (Device as a Service) from Microsoft
