= NetScaler =

Line of networking products

- Type: Private
- Industry: Networking
- Founded: December 1, 1997; 28 years ago in Santa Clara, California, United States
- Founder: Michel K. Susai
- Headquarters: San Jose, California, United States
- Area served: Worldwide
- Key people: Tom Krause (CEO)
- Parent: Cloud Software Group
- Website: www.netscaler.com

NetScaler is a line of networking products owned by Cloud Software Group. The products consist of multiple networking tools and services. NetScaler was initially developed in 1997 by Michel K Susai and acquired by Citrix Systems in 2005. Citrix consolidated all of its networking products under the NetScaler brand in 2016. On September 30, 2022, when Citrix was taken private as part of the merger with TIBCO Software, NetScaler was formed as a business unit under the Cloud Software Group.

== Overview ==
The NetScaler line of products are the networking business unit for Cloud Software Group. It includes NetScaler ADCs, NetScaler Unified Gateway, NetScaler AppFirewall, NetScaler Intelligent Traffic Management, and NetScaler Application Delivery Manager. The products can work in conjunction with other Cloud Software Group offerings, including its Citrix and Xen line of products.

NetScaler is integrated with OpenStack as part of Cloud Software Group's sponsorship of the OpenStack Foundation.

=== Products ===
NetScaler is an application delivery controller (ADC). and described by TechTarget's Michael Otey as "Cloud Software Group’s core networking product". It The product is aimed at business customers and it performs tasks such as traffic optimization, L4-L7 load balancing, and web app acceleration while maintaining data security.

NetScaler monitors server health and allocates network and application traffic to additional servers for efficient use of resources. It also performs several kinds of caching and compression. It can be made a server proxy, process SSL requests, and offers VPN and micro-app VPN operations. It also includes NetScaler application firewall and SSL encryption capabilities. NetScaler ADC can manage traffic during DDoS attacks, making sure traffic gets to critical applications. Additionally, NetScaler's logs of network activity feed into Citrix's cloud-based analytics service and are used to analyze and identify security risks.

There are five versions of NetScaler: NetScaler MPX, a hardware-based appliance for use in data centers; NetScaler SDX, a hardware-based appliance intended for service providers that provides virtualization delivering multitenancy for virtual and cloud-based data centers; NetScaler VPX, a software-based application that is implemented as a virtual machine and intended for small business use; and NetScaler CPX, a NetScaler ADC packaged in a container and designed for cloud and microservices applications. NetScaler BLX is a software form factor that runs natively on bare-metal Linux servers, without a hypervisor or container layer.

NetScaler Unified Gateway allows for remote access of virtual desktops and a variety applications from a single point of entry and with single sign-on.

The NetScaler Application Delivery Management (ADM) is a platform designed for the organization and automation of policy management across devices and applications. The tool is used to manage the various NetScaler products from a single dashboard. The platform also provides analytics.

== History ==
1997 - Entrepreneur Michel K. Susai founded NetScaler December 1, 1997 in San Jose, California. He created NetScaler as a solution for reducing infrastructure during the growth of the Internet in the late 1990s.

2000 - NetScaler ships the first product, WebScaler 3000.

2001 - The company repositioned NetScaler as a security and optimization tool in 2001. NetScaler releases a load balancer.

2002 - The release of NetScaler 9000, a load balancer with integrated SSL and compression offload.

2004 – NetScaler offers a load balancer with support for SSLVPN. Security Weekly calls the NetScaler RS9800HA-T "[..]the fastest unit in the test" and recommends the product.

By 2005, NetScaler estimated 75 percent of Internet users used its systems through clients including Google and Amazon. Citrix acquired NetScaler in 2005 for approximately $300 million in cash and stock.

2006 – NetScaler offers the 11000 series.

2007 – NetScaler offers the MPX-17xxx series systems, the first NetScaler with 10G connectivity.

2008/2009 – NetScaler transitions from the uniprocessor to the multiprocessor packet engine implementation.

2009 - NetScaler introduced the VPX edition the following year.

2011 - NetScaler offers the MPX-115xx series of systems. NetScaler also releases the SDX, a multi-tenant ADC hardware platform.

2016 - Citrix transitioned all of its delivery products under the NetScaler brand.

== Security issues ==
=== Citrix Bleed ===
In 2023, reports emerged of cyber criminals exploiting a vulnerability in Citrix NetScaler and the French Agence Nationale de la Cybersécurité issued advisories to correct "Citrix Bleed".

In 2025, the Dutch Public Prosecution Service and other governmental institutions suffered a data leak due to Citrix Bleed.
