= Rdesktop =

Free remote desktop software

rdesktop
- rdesktop connected to a Windows NT 4.0 Terminal Server Edition host
- Developer: rdesktop team
- Release: April 4, 2001; 25 years ago
- Final release: 1.9.0 / October 11, 2019; 7 years ago
- Operating system: Unix-like; Microsoft Windows (unofficial)
- Successor: FreeRDP
- Type: Microsoft Remote Desktop Services client
- License: GPL-3.0-or-later
- Website: www.rdesktop.org
- Repository: github.com/rdesktop

rdesktop is an implementation of a client software for Microsoft's proprietary Remote Desktop Protocol (RDP). rdesktop is free and open-source software, subject to the requirements of the GNU General Public License (GPL-3.0-or-later), and is available for Linux and BSD as well as for Microsoft Windows.

As of August 2013, rdesktop implements a large subset of the RDP 5 protocol. Unlike Remote Desktop Connection in modern versions of Windows, rdesktop still supports the older RDP 4.0 protocol used by Windows NT 4.0 Terminal Server Edition and Windows 2000 Server.

== Feature set ==
RDP5 features supported:

- Bitmap caching
- File system, audio, serial port and printer port redirection
- Mappings for most international keyboards
- Stream compression and encryption
- Automatic authentication
- Smartcard support
- RemoteApp like support called "seamless" mode via Seamless RDP
- Network Level Authentication

Still unimplemented are:

- Client redirection upon reconnect (of disconnected session)
- Remote Assistance requests
- USB device redirection

Support for the additional features available in RDP 5.1 and RDP 6 (including multi-head display spanning, window composition and console connection) have not yet been implemented, although some, such as RDP 6 Bulk Compression, RDP 6 Bitmap Compression, and the RDP 6.0 GDI Acceleration Extension have been officially documented on Microsoft Learn.

== Use ==
Rdesktop is commonly used on desktop ReactOS and Linux installations to connect to Microsoft Windows running Remote Desktop Services. There are many GUI clients, like tsclient, Gnome-RDP and KDE Remote Desktop Connection (KRDC), which are graphical front-ends to rdesktop. The program has also been integrated into several thin client Linux distributions like Thinkstation and the PC TSC project, as well as some thin client appliances.

== See also ==
- xrdp – an implementation of a server software for RDP
- Comparison of remote desktop software
