= Tsclient =

tsclient
- tsclient 3.4.2 running on Linux with GTK4
- Developers: Erick Woods and contributors
- Stable release: 3.4.2 / November 4, 2026; 11 days ago
- Written in: C
- Operating system: Linux
- Type: Remote desktop software
- License: GNU GPL v3
- Website: github.com/woodpile72/tsclient

tsclient (Terminal Server Client) is a free and open-source graphical frontend for remote desktop and remote access applications on Linux. Originally developed by Erick Woods, it provides a unified interface for configuring, saving, and launching remote connections using protocols including Remote Desktop Protocol (RDP), Virtual Network Computing (VNC), Secure Shell (SSH), and XDMCP.

Early versions were developed using GTK2 and integrated with the GNOME desktop environment. The modern application uses GTK4 and supports both rdesktop and FreeRDP for RDP connections.

== History ==
tsclient was originally developed as a GTK-based frontend for rdesktop and other remote access tools. Early versions provided saved connection profiles, display and audio configuration, translations, and a GNOME panel applet for launching saved connections.

Version 0.150 was released in April 2007. Historical application credits identify Erick Woods, Kyle Davis, Jonh Wendell, and Benoit Poulet.

A separate 2.0 rewrite was undertaken in connection with Red Hat and Fedora. That development branch was subsequently abandoned and is not the basis of the current application.

Development of the original project lineage later resumed with version 3.0, introducing a GTK4 interface, JSON-based connection profiles, and integration with the Cinnamon desktop environment.

Version 3.4.2 was released in November 2026. It introduced FreeRDP as a selectable RDP client, corrected GTK4 radio-button initialization, and updated Debian packaging.

== Features ==
tsclient provides a graphical interface for configuring and launching remote access sessions through external protocol clients.

For RDP connections, it supports rdesktop and FreeRDP versions 2 and 3, using the xfreerdp or xfreerdp3 executables. Supported connection settings include display resolution, color depth, fullscreen operation, audio, clipboard integration, and authentication-related options.

Connection profiles are stored in a JSON-based .tsc format. Legacy tsclient flat-file profiles are also supported for backward compatibility.

The application includes a connection picker for accessing saved profiles. A Cinnamon panel applet provides access to recently used connections.

== Development ==
tsclient is written in C and distributed under the GNU General Public License. Source code, release archives, and Linux installation packages are maintained on GitHub.

== See also ==
- Remmina – Remote desktop software client for POSIX-based operating systems
- Comparison of remote desktop software
