= Alpine Data Labs =

Environment for analytics

- Type: Private
- Founded: San Mateo, California 2011
- Founders: Anderson Wong & Yi-Ling Chen
- Headquarters: San Francisco, California, USA
- Key people: Dan Udoutch, President & CEO Steven Hillion, Chief Product Officer
- Services: Advanced Analytics on Hadoop and Big Data
- Number of employees: 45 (As of October 2013)
- Website: www.alpinedata.com

Alpine Data Labs is an advanced analytics interface working with Apache Hadoop and big data. It provides a collaborative, visual environment to create and deploy analytics workflow and predictive models. This aims to make analytics more suitable for business analyst level staff, like sales and other departments using the data, rather than requiring a "data engineer" or "data scientist" who understands languages like MapReduce or Pig.

Dan Udoutch serves as president and CEO of Alpine Data Labs.

== History ==
Ex-Greenplum employees Anderson Wong and Yi-Ling Chen developed an app that could work with databases, which was used by the Data Science team at EMC as well as early customers in Financial Services and Digital Media. Alpine Data Labs was co-founded by Wong and Chen in 2010. That year, Alpine raised 7.5 million in Series A round funding from EMC Greenplum, Sierra Ventures, Mission Ventures, and Sumitomo Corp. Equity Asia. The funding was used in part to set up Alpine's headquarters in San Mateo, California. Alpine also appointed its Chief Product Officer, Steven Hillion, who had led the Data Science team at Greenplum. Alpine's core product then, Alpine Miner, allowed for non-data scientists to create predictive analytics data models without using code and used an "In-Database" model. In June 2011, Alpine Miner 2.0 for Oracle Database was released.

Tom Ryan was appointed CEO and president of Alpine Data Labs in January 2012 and served until April 2013. The following month, Joe Otto was appointed to serve as CEO and president. In November 2013, Alpine Data Labs raised $16 million in Series B venture funding. Investors included Sierra Ventures, Mission Ventures, UMC Capital, and Robert Bosch Venture Capital GmbH. That same month, it also released Alpine 3.0, which introduced a drag and drop interface and access to data from any device that with internet capabilities, including tablets and phones. This makes it possible for analysts to access data on Hadoop, and other databases and data warehouses, without IT having to move the data into another interface. Alpine also moved its headquarters from San Mateo to San Francisco in November 2013, by which point the company had significantly expanded the functional breadth of its platform with enterprise collaboration and governance features.

In 2014, the company released an integration with the R programming language, as well as support for all major Hadoop distributions and all major relational databases.

Alpine was acquired by TIBCO Software in November 2017.
