= Citrix Endpoint Management =

Endpoint management software

- Developer: Citrix Systems
- Stable release: 24.4.0 / 22 April 2024; 2 years ago
- License: Proprietary
- Website: citrix.com/products/citrix-endpoint-management/

Citrix Endpoint Management (formerly XenMobile) is on-premises and cloud-based software developed by Citrix Systems that provides unified endpoint management for corporate- and employee-owned devices for business use. It is part of the Citrix Workspace platform.

The technology that would become XenMobile was created by MDM developer Zenprise. In January 2013, Citrix acquired Zenprise. Citrix merged the existing mobile device management (MDM) functionality of Zenprise with its own Citrix Cloud Gateway mobile application management (MAM) software to create XenMobile. In June 2013, Citrix launched the initial version of XenMobile. In 2018, Citrix rebranded XenMobile as Citrix Endpoint Management.
