= LogLogic =

US technology company

- Company type: Privately held company
- Founded: 2002
- Founder: Jason DeStefano, Thomas Grabowski, Peter Jordan
- Defunct: April 12, 2012
- Fate: Acquired by TIBCO
- Headquarters: San Jose, California, USA
- Key people: Guy Churchward (CEO)
- Number of employees: 175 (2010)
- Website: loglogic.com

LogLogic is a technology company that specializes in Security Management, Compliance Reporting, and IT Operations products. LogLogic developed the first appliance-based log management platform. LogLogic's Log Management platform collects and correlates user activity and event data. LogLogic's products are used by many of the world's largest enterprises to rapidly identify and alert on compliance violations, policy breaches, cyber attacks, and insider threats.

== History ==
LogLogic was founded in 2002 by Jason DeStefano, Thomas Grabowski, and Peter Jordan in Minneapolis, Minnesota. The company was established to help IT system administrators automate the management of log data and diagnose system problems.

In 2009, LogLogic released database security and compliance management products and acquired Exaprotect, a security information and event management (SIEM) company.

In 2012, the company was acquired by TIBCO, a software solutions company.

== Products ==
LogLogic makes a computer appliance that IT system administrators, compliance managers, CIOs and CiSOs can use to collect logs and events from network devices, servers, databases, operating systems and applications. The appliances also translate various log formats, search through logs, generate alerts and create graphs with logging trends.

LogLogic products help in several industry compliance mandates and standards, such as the Payment Card Industry Data Security Standard (PCI DSS), Health Insurance Portability and Accountability Act (HIPAA) and Sarbanes–Oxley (SOX).

== See also ==
- Loggly
- Sumo Logic
- Splunk
