= EmbeddedXEN =

A detailed architecture.

EmbeddedXEN is a Type-1 (bare metal) hypervisor based on the open source XEN hypervisor from Citrix.

EmbeddedXEN results from several Years of Research in the field of ARM-based CPUs and hypervisor technology based on XEN. The overall architecture has been revisited in order to support the hardware diversity of ARM CPUs platforms and provide an excellent framework to deal with a native OS and a third-party OS cross-compiled from a different ARM CPU. EmbeddedXEN provide a virtualized hardware interface to the third-party OS. EmbeddedXEN has been initiated and is under current development at the Reconfigurable Embedded Digital Systems (REDS) Institute of HEIG-VD, Switzerland.

EmbeddedXEN has been released as an open source project on SourceForge.

From March 2020, a novel framework called SOO (Smart Object Oriented) has been released on Gitlab. It followed the evolution with deep changes from EmbeddedXEN (also called Embx) from many Years. EmbeddedXEN is considered as development basis at the origin of SOO.
