= Cloudways =

Cloud hosting platform

- Trade name: Cloudways
- Type: Subsidiary
- Industry: Cloud computing; Web hosting
- Founded: August 1, 2012; 14 years ago
- Founders: Aaqib Gadit; Pere Hospital
- Headquarters: New York, United States
- Area served: Worldwide
- Key people: Paddy Srinivasan (CEO); Suhaib Zaheer (SVP)
- Products: ThunderStack server stack
- Brands: Cloudways
- Services: Managed cloud hosting
- Parent: DigitalOcean

Cloudways is a managed cloud hosting platform founded in 2012, enabling users to deploy web applications on servers from providers like DigitalOcean, AWS, Google Cloud, Linode and Vultr.

== History ==
Cloudways was founded in 2012 by Aaqib Gadit and Pere Hospital in Malta. It was designed to simplify cloud hosting with automation, managed services, and an easy-to-use interface. It grew by serving small and medium-sized businesses, digital agencies and e-commerce platforms needing cloud solutions without direct server management.

== Acquisition by DigitalOcean ==
In August 2022, DigitalOcean Holdings Inc. announced its intention to acquire Cloudways for $350 million in cash. The acquisition was completed in September 2022 and aligned with DigitalOcean's strategy to enhance its offerings for small and medium-sized enterprises through integrated managed hosting services.

== Services and features ==
Cloudways provides managed cloud hosting that supports deployment on leading infrastructure providers such as DigitalOcean, AWS, Google Cloud and Linode. Its proprietary Thunder Stack includes Nginx, Apache, Memcached, Varnish, Redis, and PHP-FPM to optimize application performance. The platform manages server setup, maintenance, security patches, backups, and performance monitoring.

In 2022, Cloudways integrated Cloudflare services to offer advanced features such as CDN, DDoS protection, and a Web Application Firewall (WAF).
