= Azure Virtual Desktop =

Desktop virtualization service

Azure Virtual Desktop (AVD)
- Developer: Microsoft
- Release: September 2019; 7 years ago
- Stable release: 1.2.6353.0 / July 8, 2025; 16 months ago
- Operating system: Windows, macOS, Android, iOS, and HTML5 web browsers
- Platform: Cross-platform
- Type: Desktop virtualization service
- Website: Official site

Azure Virtual Desktop (AVD), formerly known as Windows Virtual Desktop (WVD), is a Microsoft Azure-based system for virtualizing Windows operating systems, providing virtualized desktops and applications securely in the cloud (over the Internet) using the Remote Desktop Protocol. It is aimed at enterprise customers rather than at individual users.

== Overview ==
Azure Virtual Desktop with Windows 10/11 Enterprise Multi-Session is a cloud-based alternative to an on-premise Remote Desktop Server (RDS). AVD is deployed in Azure Cloud as a virtual machine. License costs are already included in several Microsoft 365 subscriptions, including Microsoft 365 Business Premium or Microsoft 365 E3.

== History ==
Azure Virtual Desktop was first announced by Microsoft in September 2018, available as a public preview in March 2019, and generally available at the end of September 2019.

== Client software ==
Azure Virtual Desktops can be accessed with the Remote Desktop client for Windows, also called Azure Virtual Desktop, on Windows and with Microsoft Remote Desktop on other platforms, including the web. Other non-Microsoft Remote Desktop Protocol clients can also be used to connect to Azure Virtual Desktops.

== Compatibility ==
Azure Virtual Desktop supports Windows 10/11 multi-session, Windows 10/11 single-session, Windows Server 2012 R2 and newer operating systems.

== See also ==
- Windows 365
- Remote Desktop Services
- Windows Virtual PC
