= Citrix Workspace App =

Virtualization software client

Citrix Workspace
- Developer: Citrix
- Operating system: Windows, macOS, Linux, Android, iOS
- Type: Desktop Virtualization
- License: Freeware, source-available
- Website: www.citrix.com/products/receiver/

Citrix Workspace App (formerly Citrix Receiver) is the client component of XenDesktop, and XenApp, developed by Citrix Systems. It was released initially in 2009.

== Product Overview ==
Devices with Receiver installed are able to access full desktops via XenDesktop or individual applications via XenApp from a centralized host, such as a server or cloud infrastructure.

As of August 2018, Citrix Workspace app has replaced Citrix Receiver. Citrix Workspace app provides the full capabilities of Citrix Receiver, as well as new capabilities based on your organization’s Citrix deployment.

== History ==
Prior to Receiver, Citrix had a different client for each of its products. The company developed Receiver to handle the management of those clients. Citrix Receiver was announced in 2009 and the first version became available later that year. As of August 2018, Citrix Workspace app has replaced Citrix Receiver.
