= Nirvana Phone =

A Nirvana Phone was a marketing phrase coined by Citrix for a smartphone that could be docked with external displays and keyboards to create an alternative desktop or laptop computer system. It was to define a new category of mobile device with a capability beyond a conventional smartphone computer. The NirvanaPhone provides the processor, storage media, display adapter, communication channels, and operating system. The docking station provides power, and connectivity. To be useful the NirvanaPhone differs from a simple smartphone by having significant processing power, video output at high resolution, plus keyboard and mouse input. A smartphone is generally accepted as a device that has both mobile phone capability as well as an operating system that can run applications such as email, web browser, media player and personal organizers. The NirvanaPhone adds external monitor capability which could be a computer monitor, an HDTV, or a video projector. The dock could be a cradle, cable or a wireless connection. This allows the NirvanaPhone to run applications that can utilize a full-sized display for better readability or collaboration. Or in combination with a keyboard and mouse, perhaps using Bluetooth, the NirvanaPhone could act as a thin client connected to a virtual desktop for business use.

== History ==
The concept of using a smartphone as a PC has been around for a number of years. As early as 2002, the Treo 180 running Palm OS could be docked with a keyboard but lacked data communications. By 2007, the Nokia N93/N95 smartphone running Symbian OS included a TV-out feature, but the NTSC video was only adequate for photo and low resolution video viewing and the phone did not support many applications. The newer Nokia phones have HD video-out capability and their application set and connectivity options have grown. The i-Mate 8501/8502, also released in 2007, was perhaps the first smartphone that provided a full 1024×768 XVGA resolution which could support a full desktop user interface. While short-lived, the i-Mate with a receiver application installed and network linked to a remote server with desktop virtualization software could provide a full PC experience.

As early as 2008, Citrix Systems coined the phrase Nirvana Phone and articulated the benefits. To minimize the processing, memory, and storage requirements on the phone, Citrix and Open Kernel Labs developed a thin client - virtual server software suite that was first demonstrated in 2010.

In 2010 a new generation of smartphones appeared including many that have the required video-out capability to qualify as a NirvanaPhone. The HTC EVO phone includes HDMI capability which can output 720p resolution, high enough for virtual desktop usage. The Dell Streak also includes HDMI through a docking station. The iPhone 4 provide an optional VGA connector that can support up to 1024×768 resolution, also potentially capable of a desktop experience when connected to an external monitor. This movement included Nvidia's Tegra 2 system-on-a-chip that integrated both multiple CPUs and a GPU.

By 2011, the Motorola Atrix 4G was introduced as a fully operational NirvanaPhone. Using the Atrix's 1280×720 video output through a mini-HDMI connector, Motorola developed a light docking station that converts the Atrix into an instant laptop. The Atrix smartphone also has a dual-core 1 GHz processor, giving it better performance than many contemporary smartphones and tablets. The concept used by the Atrix received positive reviews and awards such as best smartphone CES 2011 However the Atrix specifically has also had negative reviews based on the cost of the docking stations.

== Current implementations ==
Both Samsung and Motorola have desktop modes built into their phones, called Samsung DeX and Motorola ReadyFor respectively.

== See also ==
- Docking station
- Portable computer
- Mobile computing
- Mobile device
- Smartphone
- Samsung DeX
