= Cloud Software Group =

American software conglomerate

- Type: Private
- Industry: Computing
- Founded: 2022; 4 years ago
- Headquarters: Fort Lauderdale, Florida, United States
- Key people: Tom Krause (CEO)
- Subsidiaries: Arctera; Citrix; TIBCO Software
- Website: www.cloud.com

Cloud Software Group (CSG) is an American software conglomerate formed by Vista Equity Partners and Evergreen Coast Capital through the merger of Citrix and TIBCO Software.

== History ==
On January 31, 2022, it was announced that Citrix had been acquired in a $16.5 billion deal by affiliates of Vista Equity Partners and Evergreen Coast Capital. Citrix would merge with TIBCO Software, a Vista portfolio company, to form Cloud Software Group. In July 2022, Citrix announced that Tom Krause would succeed Robert Calderoni as CEO following the merger. It was also reported that Citrix would go private as part of the deal. As part of the merger, in September 2022, Citrix announced a $4.55 billion-equivalent cross-border term loan to back its $16.5 billion buyout by Vista Equity and Evergreen Coast Capital. Following the merger, the Citrix Hypervisor product-line was spun-off into a standalone business unit under Cloud Software Group and rebranded as XenServer.

In July 2022, Krause became chief executive officer of the Cloud Software Group. After Krause joined Cloud Software group it laid off 15 percent of its employees. A year later it laid off an additional 12 percent.

In January 2025, Krause became involved with the U.S. Treasury Department as part of the Department of Government Efficiency (DOGE). He was assigned as a special government employee to review the federal payment system and was granted limited access as a liaison between the Treasury and DOGE. On February 7, 2025, he was appointed as the Fiscal Assistant Secretary of the Treasury, succeeding Matthew Garber, who had been acting in the role since David Lebryk's resignation. Krause continued to work at Cloud Software Group despite his employment by DOGE, which has been cited as a potential conflict of interest.

In August 2025, Cloud Software acquired Arctera from The Carlyle Group. Arctera held the product lines from the legacy Veritas Technologies that The Carlyle Group did not sell to Cohesity. The portfolio includes BackupExec, InfoScale, and other data-management, -integrity, and -governance products.

== See also ==
- JasperReports
- Spotfire
