= Zenprise =

Zenprise, Inc.
- Type: Subsidiary
- Founded: 2003
- Founders: Dr. Waheed Qureshi & Jayaram Bhat
- Headquarters: Redwood City, California, United States
- Key people: Jayram Bhat (CEO (2003-2012)); Amit Pandey (CEO (2012)); Waheed Qureshi (Founder, Chairman, CTO); Steve Valenzuela (CFO); Ahmed Datoo (CMO)
- Services: mobile device management
- Parent: Citrix
- Website: zenprise.com

Zenprise provided Mobile Device Management (MDM) solutions to enterprises. The company's solutions were available in both on-premise and cloud-based (SaaS) versions. Zenprise MobileManager and Zencloud allowed companies and government agencies to manage and secure mobile devices, including iOS, Android, BlackBerry, Windows Mobile, and Symbian.

== History ==
Zenprise was co-founded in 2003 by Waheed Qureshi & Jayaram Bhat. Initially the company developed remote support and diagnostics software to help companies manage large-scale BlackBerry deployments. As the market evolved to enterprises supporting a diverse set of smartphones and tablets, Zenprise shifted its product development efforts to support the major mobile platforms, including iPhone and iPad, Android, BlackBerry, Symbian, and Windows Mobile. In 2010, Zenprise acquired French Mobile Device Management vendor, Sparus Software, and integrated Sparus's software into its core product offering.

In July 2011, Zenprise launched Zencloud, the cloud version of its Mobile Device Management software. Zencloud is hosted in globally-redundant, SAS70 Type II-, FISMA Moderate-compliant, and Federal Cloud Certified facilities.

In September 2011, Zenprise developed and launched a free application on Splunkbase. Called Zenprise Mobile Security Intelligence, the application integrates with Zenprise mobile device management software, and provides visibility into mobile users and mobile device traffic.

In September 2011, Zenprise launched their Mobile Data Leakage Prevention (DLP) solution, which provides a secure document container for mobile devices as well policy-based control over content.

In October 2011, Zenprise raised $30 million from investors, including Bay Partners, Ignition Partners, Mayfield Fund, Rembrandt Venture Partners, Shasta Ventures, and newly added venture firm, Greylock Partners.

In December 2012 Citrix announced its intent to acquire Zenprise. The acquisition closed in January 2013.

== Products and features ==
Zenprise MobileManager: An on-premises Mobile Device Management solution focused on providing mobile device lifecycle management and mobile security across devices, applications, the network, and data.
Zencloud: Cloud version of Zenprise's mobile device management software. Zencloud can be deployed as a standalone cloud solution or hybrid solution for policy enforcement at the mobile gateway.
Services, support, and training: Zenprise offers 24x7x365 technical support on five continents and in ten languages, instructor-led in-person and web-based training, and a number of professional services offerings tailored to Mobile Device Management deployments.

== Customers and partners ==
Today, Zenprise has more than 1,000 global enterprise and government customers, including Monsanto, the Boston Red Sox, Cegedim, Shook, Hardy & Bacon, Cyberonics, PerkinElmer, Arsenal, ScentAir, Ross Stores, Jelly Belly, Carnival Corporation & PLC and Knight Transportation.

Zenprise has a network of channel and technology partners which include: Trace3, Fishnet, Accuvant, iSecure, IT21, Radpoint, RIM, Microsoft, Cisco, F5 Networks, and Palo Alto Networks.
