= List of Remote Desktop Protocol clients =

Remote Desktop Protocol clients allow users to connect to servers running Remote Desktop Services, Azure Virtual Desktop, or non-Microsoft server software to enable remote desktop functionality. Since the release of Remote Desktop Connection, there have been several additional Remote Desktop Protocol clients created by both Microsoft and other parties.

== By Microsoft ==
=== Remote Desktop Connection ===
Remote Desktop Connection
- Other names: Microsoft Terminal Services Client
- Developer: Microsoft

Stable release(s) [±]
- Windows 11: 10.0 (Build 26100.8521) / May 26, 2026; 5 months ago
- Windows 10: 10.0 (Build 19045.7184) / April 14, 2026; 6 months ago
- Included with: Microsoft Windows
- Successor: Microsoft Remote Desktop

Remote Desktop Connection (RDC, also called Remote Desktop or just RD) is the client application for RDS. The program has the filename mstsc.exe and in Windows 2000 and prior, it was known as Microsoft Terminal Services Client (MSTSC or tsclient). It allows a user to remotely log into a networked computer running the Remote Desktop Services. RDC presents the desktop interface (or application GUI) of the remote system, as if it were accessed locally. In addition to regular username/password for authorizing for the remote session, RDC also supports using smart cards for authorization. Although replacements have been released, as of the release of the Windows App, Remote Desktop Connection is still recommended for use.

RDC 6.0 was released as part of Windows Vista. With RDC 6.0, the resolution of a remote session can be set independently of the settings at the remote computer. If the Desktop Experience component is plugged into the remote server, remote application user interface elements (e.g., application windows borders, Maximize, Minimize, and Close buttons etc.) will take on the same appearance of local applications. In this scenario, the remote applications will use the Aero theme if the user connects to the server from a Windows Vista machine running Aero. Later versions of the protocol also support rendering the UI in full 32-bit color, as well as resource redirection for printers, COM ports, disk drives, mice and keyboards. With resource redirection, remote applications can use the resources of the local computer. Audio is also redirected, so that any sounds generated by a remote application are played back at the client system. Moreover, a remote session can also span multiple monitors at the client system, independent of the multi-monitor settings at the server. RDC can also be used to connect to Windows Media Center (WMC) remote sessions; however, since WMC does not stream video using RDP, only the applications can be viewed this way, not any media.

RDC prioritizes UI data as well as keyboard and mouse inputs, as opposed to print jobs or file transfers. so as to make the applications more responsive. It redirects plug and play devices such as cameras, portable music players, and scanners, so that input from these devices can be used by the remote applications as well. RDC can also be used to connect to computers which are exposed via Windows Home Server RDP Gateway over the Internet. Finally, few shortcuts that will be handy

- To achieve Ctrl+Alt+Del effect on remote desktop, you can use the Ctrl+Alt+End key combination.
- To alternate between the full screen and window mode of remote desktop, you can use Ctrl+Alt+Break ( Ctrl+Fn+Alt+⇧ Shift on certain HP laptops).

=== Microsoft Remote Desktop ===
Microsoft Remote Desktop
- The icon used for the Windows version
- Other names: Remote Desktop
- Developer: Microsoft
- Release: September 8, 2012; 14 years ago
- Final release: 10.2.4012 / August 27, 2025; 14 months ago
- Operating system: Windows 10, 11; macOS Catalina+; Android, iOS, iPadOS, web; Discontinued: Windows 8, 8.1 (2023)
- Predecessor: Remote Desktop Connection
- Successor: Remote Desktop client for Windows (for Azure Virtual Desktop); Windows App

Microsoft Remote Desktop, also called Remote Desktop, is a modern client for RDS released in September 2012. Compared to the older Remote Desktop Connection, the program offers a touch-friendly interface. It allows users to connect to remote PCs, RemoteApp programs, session-based desktops, and virtual desktops. The program is available on Windows as a Universal Windows Platform on the Microsoft Store, MacOS as Microsoft Remote Desktop for Mac, Android, iOS, iPadOS, and on all platforms as a web client. The Windows version of the app is no longer being updated with new features or support for Azure Virtual Desktop. Instead, Azure users are recommend to use the Remote Desktop client for Windows.

In April 2025, Microsoft announced that support for Remote Desktop app ended on May 27, 2025, urging users to transition to its successor, the Windows App.

==== Web client ====
In late 2018 Microsoft released an HTML5 web client for Microsoft Remote Desktop. The client allows users to connect to their remote apps or to their remote desktops without using an installed remote desktop client. It is one of the components of Microsoft Windows that allow a user to initiate and control an interactive session. The web client uses the TLS secured port 443 and does not use the RD Gateway to transport traffic, instead relying solely on the remote desktop session host aspect of remote desktop services.

As of today there are several companies that offer a browser-based RDP client that allow remote desktop access via any modern web browser, eliminating the need for local client software. Thincast provides an HTML5-based RD WebClient for seamless access to Windows desktops and apps. Apache Guacamole is a popular open-source option supporting RDP, VNC, and SSH. Other notable solutions include Chrome Remote Desktop, Ericom AccessNow or TSPLus.

=== Remote Desktop client for Windows ===
Remote Desktop client for Windows
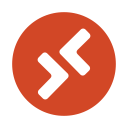
- Other names: Microsoft Remote Desktop; Azure Virtual Desktop
- Developer: Microsoft
- Release: April 6, 2022; 4 years ago
- Stable release: 1.2.7430 / November 11, 2026; 1 day ago
- Operating system: Windows 10, 11
- Predecessor: Microsoft Remote Desktop
- Successor: Windows App
- Website: learn.microsoft.com

The Remote Desktop client for Windows (MSRDC), branded as Microsoft Remote Desktop and Azure Virtual Desktop if installed from the Microsoft Store, is a client that uses the Remote Desktop Protocol to allow users to connect to Azure Virtual Desktops on feeds made available by enterprise administrators. The program can be downloaded as an MSI installer as Remote Desktop or from the Microsoft Store as Azure Virtual Desktop.

In contrast with Microsoft Remote Desktop and like the older Remote Desktop Connection program, MSRDC allows for the redirection of local USB and serial devices. MSRDC is also used by Windows Subsystem for Linux to display programs with a graphical user interface.

In May 2025, Microsoft announced that support for MSRDC ended on March 27, 2026 and replaced by the Windows App. However, the product continues to receive security updates as of November 2026.

=== Windows App ===
Windows App
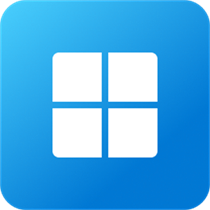
- Developer: Microsoft
- Release: September 19, 2024; 2 years ago

Stable release(s) [±]
- Windows: 2.0.1485 / November 1, 2026; 11 days ago
- macOS: 11.4.4 / October 15, 2026; 28 days ago
- Android: 11.0.0.68 / November 14, 2025; 11 months ago
- iOS (Note: Including iPadOS and visionOS): 11.4 / October 27, 2026; 16 days ago
- Operating system: Windows 10, 11; macOS 14+; Android 9+; iOS 26+; ChromeOS, web
- Predecessor: Microsoft Remote Desktop; Remote Desktop client for Windows
- Website: learn.microsoft.com/en-us/windows-app/

The Windows App is a Remote Desktop Protocol client that allows users to connect to Windows 365, Azure Virtual Desktop, and Microsoft Dev Box instances. Additionally, on non-Windows platforms excluding the browser, the Windows App allows users to connect to servers running Remote Desktop Services and remote PCs. On Windows, Microsoft advises users to use Remote Desktop Connection to connect to remote PCs and Remote Desktop client for Windows to connect to Remote Desktop Services. The app is available on Windows, macOS, iOS, iPadOS, Android, ChromeOS, and through web browsers.

The preview version of the app was first released in November 2023 and it was fully launched on September 19, 2024. The app was developed as a unified way to access Windows PCs remotely and as replacement for Microsoft Remote Desktop. The app supports many of the features of Remote Desktop Connection include multi-monitor support, device redirection, and dynamic resolution.

=== Windows Mobile ===
A RDS client also existed for Windows Mobile called Remote Desktop.

== Non-Microsoft ==
There have been numerous non-Microsoft implementations of clients that implement subsets of the Microsoft functionality for a range of platforms.

=== rdesktop ===
rdesktop is a free and open-source implementation of a client software for RDP. rdesktop supports most features of RDP 5, with features from RDP 5.1 and 6 not yet implemented. Unlike its Microsoft counterparts, it still supports the older RDP 4 protocol used by Windows NT 4.0. tsclient is a discontinued graphical frontend to rdesktop.

=== FreeRDP ===
FreeRDP is a RDP client/server that started as a fork of rdesktop in 2009. It was created with the aim of modularizing the code, addressing various issues, and implementing new features. FreeRDP comes with its own command-line-client xfreerdp, which supports Seamless Windows in RDP6. Around 2011, the project decided to abandon forking and instead rewrite under Apache License, adding more features like RemoteFX, RemoteApp, and NTLMv2. A commercial distribution called Thincast was started in 2019. A multi-platform client based on FreeRDP including Vulkan/H.264 support followed in summer 2020. A GTK-based client also based on FreeRDP exists, named Remmina. Gnome-RDP is also based on FreeRDP, as does KDE Remote Desktop Connection (KRDC) (in addition to LibVNCServer).

FreeRDP offers server implementations for macOS and Windows. On other systems including Linux, software packages may build upon FreeRDP to implement a complete server. Weston, the compositor in Wayland, uses FreeRDP to implement an rdp server it terms "rdp-backend". This server is in turn used by Microsoft to provide graphics support (WSLg) in its Windows Subsystem for Linux.

=== Remmina ===
Remmina is a free and open-source remote desktop client for POSIX-based systems that supports RDP along with a variety of other protocols based on FreeRDP. It is the default remote desktop client on Ubuntu.

=== Other ===
Krdc and Vinagre also support RDP. In May 2025 Thincast released a commercial HTML5 RDP Client with support for RemoteApps.

== See also ==
- Comparison of remote desktop software
