= TIBCO Software =

American enterprise software company

TIBCO Software Inc.
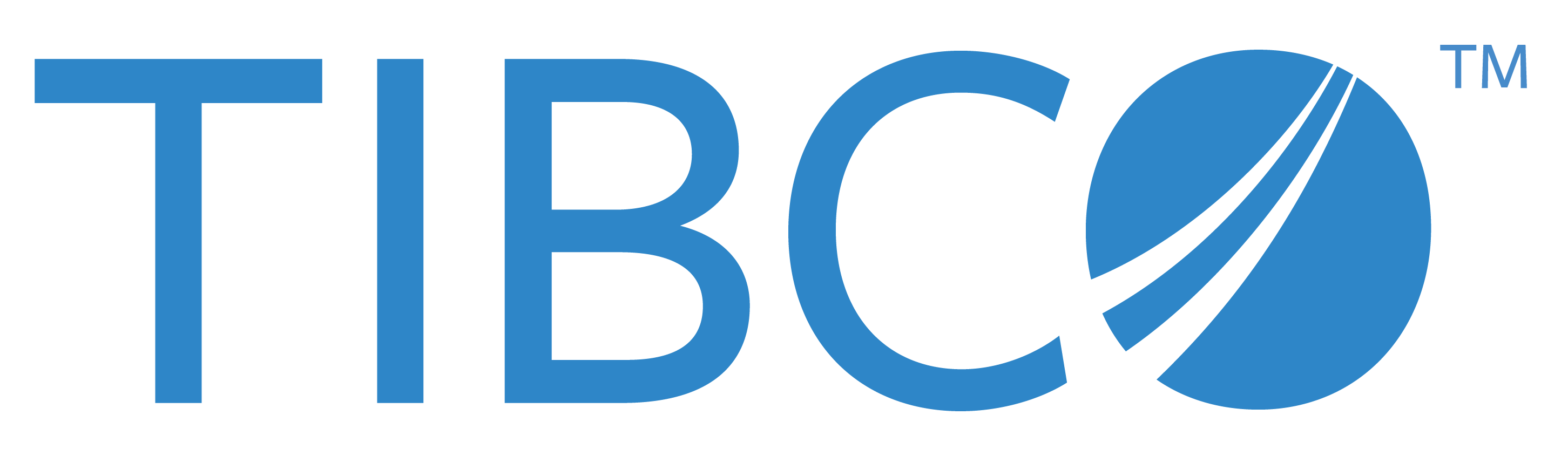
- Company type: Subsidiary
- Traded as: Nasdaq: TIBX
- Industry: Software
- Founded: 1997; 29 years ago
- Founders: Vivek Ranadivé
- Headquarters: Stanford Research Park; Palo Alto, California, U.S.
- Key people: Tom Krause (CEO); Vivek Ranadivé (Board Member); Tom Berquist (CFO)
- Products: Business intelligence tools Data visualization tools Analytics tools Big data tools
- Parent: Cloud Software Group
- Website: www.tibco.com

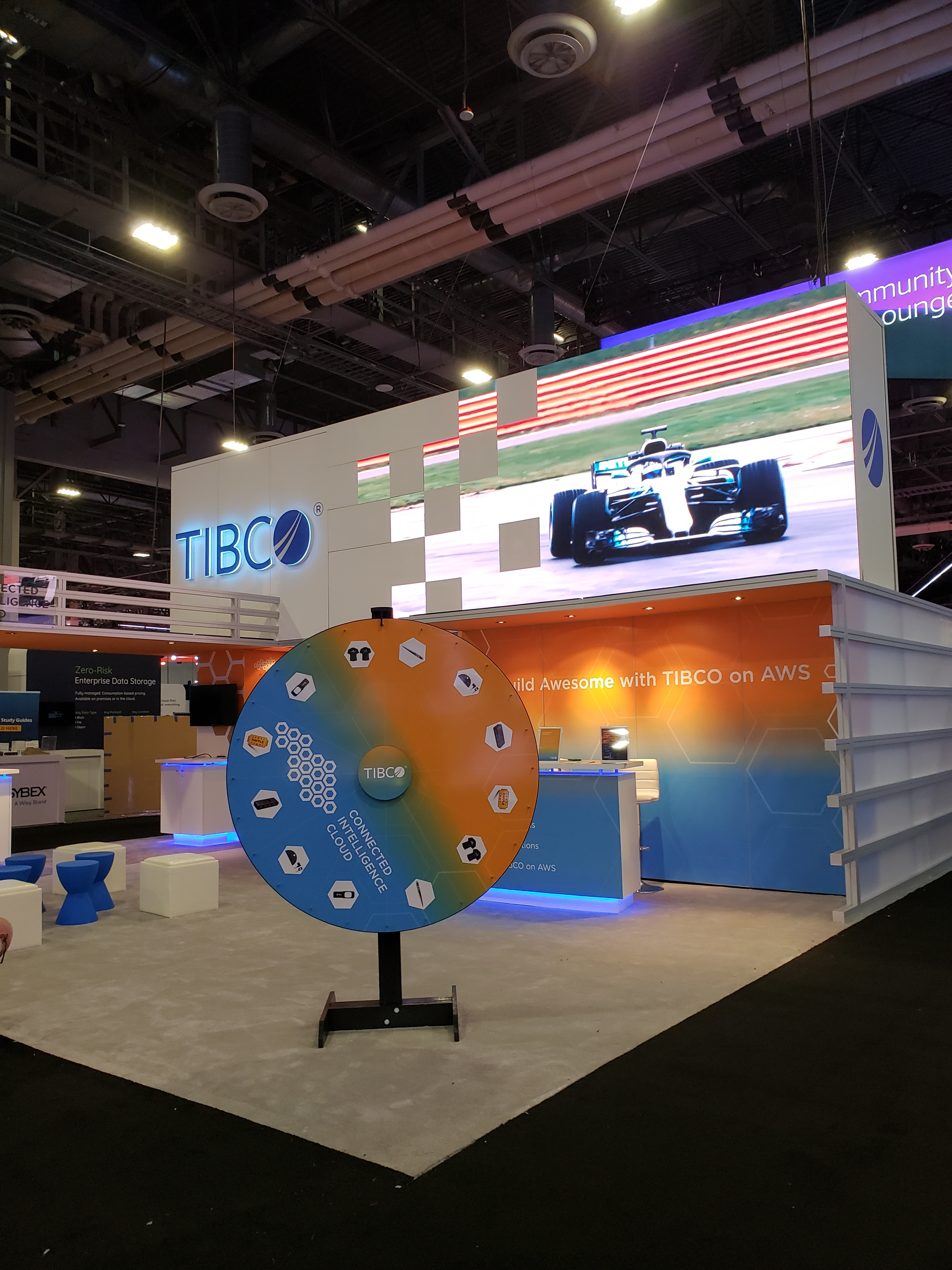
TIBCO at AWS re:Invent

TIBCO Software Inc. is a business unit of Cloud Software Group that provides enterprise software. It has headquarters in Palo Alto and offices in North America, Europe, Asia, the Middle East, Africa and South America.

== History ==
TIBCO (The Information Bus Company) was founded in 1997 by Vivek Ranadivé as a subsidiary of Reuters Holdings. Ranadivé originally developed the information bus software at his previous company, Teknekron Software Systems, which he sold to Reuters for $125 million in 1994. TIBCO's software allowed companies to receive and respond to information in real time. Later in 1997, the company became one of 13 to partner with Microsoft in the development of push technology. Its software products which primarily served the financial sector helping automation of financial transactions processing during the company's early beginnings, had evolved to be used in energy, semiconductor manufacturing, and other industries, by 1999. The company held an initial public offering (IPO) of stock on July 14, 1999. The company said it raised $109.5 million from its IPO.

In 2000, Yahoo! introduced Corporate Yahoo, a platform developed with TIBCO Software that allowed companies to bundle services including email, calendars, and news into enterprise portals. The company partnered with Hewlett-Packard, WebEx, and Citrix Systems on its development. The company survived the dot-com bubble burst and was listed among USA Today's e-Consumer and e-Business index of 50 technology companies that remained relevant in 2001 following the boom. By the spring of 2001, TIBCO had a market capitalization of $2 billion.

By 2011, the company's annual revenues had grown to $920 million, its customer base to 4,000, and its number of employees to 2,500. TIBCO was acquired by Vista Equity Partners for $4.2 billion in December 2014. Murray Rode replaced Ranadivé as chief executive officer (CEO) following the acquisition. In 2019, Rode became vice chairman of the company and Dan Streetman succeeded him as CEO.

TIBCO acquired data and analytics company Information Builders for an undisclosed sum in January 2021. In September 2022, Vista and Elliott Investment Management acquired Florida-based Citrix Systems for $16.5 billion and merged the company with TIBCO, forming Cloud Software Group. Tom Krause was named CEO of the new company.

== Products ==
TIBCO Software provides enterprise application integration, data integration, messaging, event processing, data virtualization, master data management, API management, and business process automation capabilities.

== Acquisitions ==
The company has made several acquisitions. In 2007, it acquired Spotfire, a business intelligence software company. The company also acquired security management platform LogLogic, business software provider JasperSoft, and streaming data analytics firm StreamBase Systems.

Other acquisitions include:

- In 1997, it acquired inCommon, a push software company.
- In 1999, it acquired InConcert, a telecommunication workflow company.
- In 2000, it acquired Extensibility, an XML technology company.
- In 2009, it acquired DataSynapse, a cloud computing infrastructure company.
- On March 25, 2010, the company acquired Netrics, a privately held provider of enterprise data matching software products.
- On April 20, 2010, it acquired Kabira Technologies Inc., a privately held provider of in-memory transaction-processing software.
- On September 16, 2010, the company acquired Proginet (file transfer).
- On September 23, 2010, it acquired OpenSpirit, a provider of data and application integration for exploration and production of oil and gas.
- On December 8, 2010, the company acquired Loyalty Lab Inc., a privately held independent provider of loyalty management software.
- On August 30, 2011, it acquired Nimbus, a UK-headquartered provider of business process discovery and analysis applications.
- On March 25, 2013, it acquired Maporama Solutions, a privately held provider of location intelligence and geospatial analytics solutions.
- On September 18, 2013, it acquired Extended Results, a privately held provider of mobile business intelligence software.
- On August 25, 2015, it announced the acquisition of San Francisco-based Mashery, an API management solution from Intel.
- On May 15, 2017, it announced the acquisition of Statistica, a data science platform provider.
- On July 6, 2017, it announced the acquisition of Virginia-based nanoscale.io, a microservices development platform.
- On October 5, 2017, it announced the acquisition of Cisco's Data Virtualization business (formerly Composite Software).
- In November 2017 it acquired Alpine Data Labs.
- On June 6, 2018, it announced the acquisition of integration platform-as-a-service leader Scribe Software.
- On December 4, 2018, it announced the acquisition of Paris-based Orchestra Networks, a Master Data Management leader.
- On March 7, 2019, it announced the acquisition of start-up SnappyData, a high-performance in-memory data platform.

== See also ==
- List of California companies
