= Citrix Systems =

American software company

Citrix Systems, Inc.

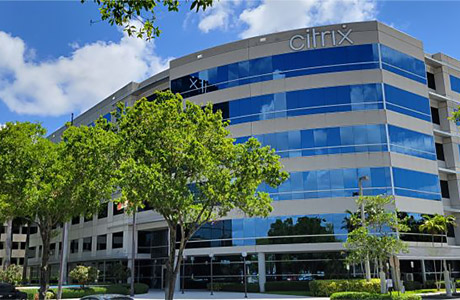
- Headquarters in Fort Lauderdale, Florida
- Type: Subsidiary
- Traded as: Nasdaq: CTXS (1995–2022)
- Industry: Cloud computing; Virtualization; Computer software
- Founded: 1989; 37 years ago in Richardson, Texas, U.S.
- Founder: Ed Iacobucci
- Headquarters: Fort Lauderdale, Florida, U.S.
- Area served: Worldwide
- Key people: Tom Krause (CEO)
- Products: Application Delivery Industry, Virtualization software (DaaS), SaaS, cloud, and networking
- Revenue: ▼US$3.22 billion (2021)
- Operating income: ▼US$237 million (2021)
- Net income: ▼US$307 million (2021)
- Total assets: ▲US$6.98 billion (2021)
- Total equity: ▲US$547 million (2021)
- Number of employees: 9,700 (December 2021)
- Parent: Cloud Software Group
- Website: citrix.com

Citrix Systems, Inc. is an American multinational cloud computing and virtualization technology company that provides server, application and desktop virtualization, networking, software as a service (SaaS), and cloud computing technologies. Citrix claims that its products are used by over 400,000 clients worldwide, including 99% of the Fortune 100 and 98% of the Fortune 500.

In 1989, Citrix was founded in Richardson, Texas, by Ed Iacobucci, who served as chairman until his departure in 2000. The company began by developing remote access products for Microsoft operating systems and licensing source code from Microsoft. Citrix has been partnered with Microsoft throughout its history. By the 1990s, Citrix had become an industry leader in thin client technology, enabling purpose-built devices to access remote servers and resources. The company launched its first initial public offering in 1995 and, with few competitors, experienced significant revenue increases between 1995 and 1999.

Citrix acquired Sequoia Software Corp. in 2001 and ExpertCity, a provider of remote desktop products, in 2003. This was followed by more than a dozen other acquisitions from 2005 to 2012, which allowed Citrix to expand into additional markets including server and desktop virtualization, cloud computing, infrastructure as a service, and software as a service. In 2014, Citrix acquired Framehawk and used its technology to improve the delivery of virtual desktops and applications over wireless networks. In 2016, as part of a $1.8 billion deal with LogMeIn, Citrix spun off the GoTo product line into a new business entity called GetGo. In 2017, Citrix completed the merger of GetGo with LogMeIn's products.

Citrix is headquartered in Fort Lauderdale, Florida, with subsidiary operations in California and Massachusetts and additional development centers in Canada, Denmark, Germany, India, and the United Kingdom. In 2021, Citrix generated $3.2 billion in revenue and had 9,700 employees.

After being acquired by Vista Equity Partners and Evergreen Coast Capital Corp on September 30, 2022, Citrix merged with TIBCO Software under the newly formed Cloud Software Group. Citrix spun off the re-branded Citrix ADC back into a standalone entity called NetScaler under the same parent.

== History ==
=== Early history ===
Original Citrix logo until September 14, 2020

In 1989, Citrix was founded in Richardson, Texas, by former IBM developer Ed Iacobucci with $3 million in funding. Following the company's initial setup and development, Iacobucci moved the company to his former home in Coral Springs, Florida. The company's first employees were five other engineers from IBM who Iacobucci convinced to join his team. Iacobucci served as chairman of the company, and Roger Roberts became the CEO of Citrix in 1990. Citrix was originally named Citrus but changed its name after an existing company claimed trademark rights. The name Citrix is a portmanteau of Citrus and UNIX.

The company's first product was Citrix Multiuser, an extension of OS/2 developed over two years. Citrix licensed the OS/2 source code from Microsoft and developed its own Independent Computing Architecture (ICA) protocol for Citrix Multiuser. Multiuser allowed multiple users working on separate computers to remotely access software on a server, even from computers that were not built to run OS/2. Three days before the product launched in 1991, Microsoft announced it would be switching from OS/2 to Windows. This change made Multiuser nearly unusable without significant changes to make it compatible with Windows or DOS. In 1991, the company discussed closing, but investments from Intel, Microsoft, and Kleiner Perkins Caufield & Byers among others allowed the company to work on a new version of Multiuser.

Multiuser version 2.0 was released in 1992. It was compatible with DOS applications and allowed up to five users. In 1993, Citrix released a new remote applications server, WinView, which could run DOS and Windows applications. By 1994, the company's yearly revenue equaled $10 million.

In 1995, the company launched Citrix WinFrame, a multi-user operating system based on Microsoft's Windows NT. This new product allowed up to 15 users and was the first thin client for Windows.

=== Rise in popularity ===
Citrix had its initial public offering in December 1995. On its first day of trading, the company's share price doubled from $15 to $30. During the mid-1990s, Citrix became the leader of its growing industry with very few competitors, and the company's revenues doubled year over year between 1995 and 1999.

After weeks of discussion, Iacobucci persuaded Microsoft to license Citrix technology for Windows NT Server 4.0, resulting in Windows Terminal Server Edition in 1998. This agreement allowed Citrix to keep its position in the marketplace and be NT 4.0 compatible. Citrix also earned $75 million and a royalty arrangement valued at approximately $100 million.

Citrix released MetaFrame 1.0 in conjunction with Terminal Server Edition. Due to weaknesses in Microsoft's Remote Desktop Protocol (RDP), Terminal Server Edition worked best with Citrix's ICA protocol which MetaFrame used. This meant that Citrix technology was purchased and installed on most machines that ran Terminal Server Edition.

In 1997, the company opened a new headquarters in Fort Lauderdale, Florida. It also opened offices in Sydney, London, and Paris that same year.

In 1998, Mark Templeton became the CEO of Citrix after serving as vice president of marketing. That year, Citrix also licensed its ICA protocol to IBM and Key Tronics. In 1999, Citrix licensed its ICA protocol to Motorola for use in digital wireless handsets.

During 1999, Citrix's thin-client model became a software trend, and the company's customers increased to 15 million. Major clients included Sears, AT&T, and Chevron. In 2000, the burst of the dot-com bubble led to Iacobucci leaving the company and CEO Mark Templeton being demoted to the president and senior executive officer. Templeton was later reinstated in 2001.

=== Expansion ===
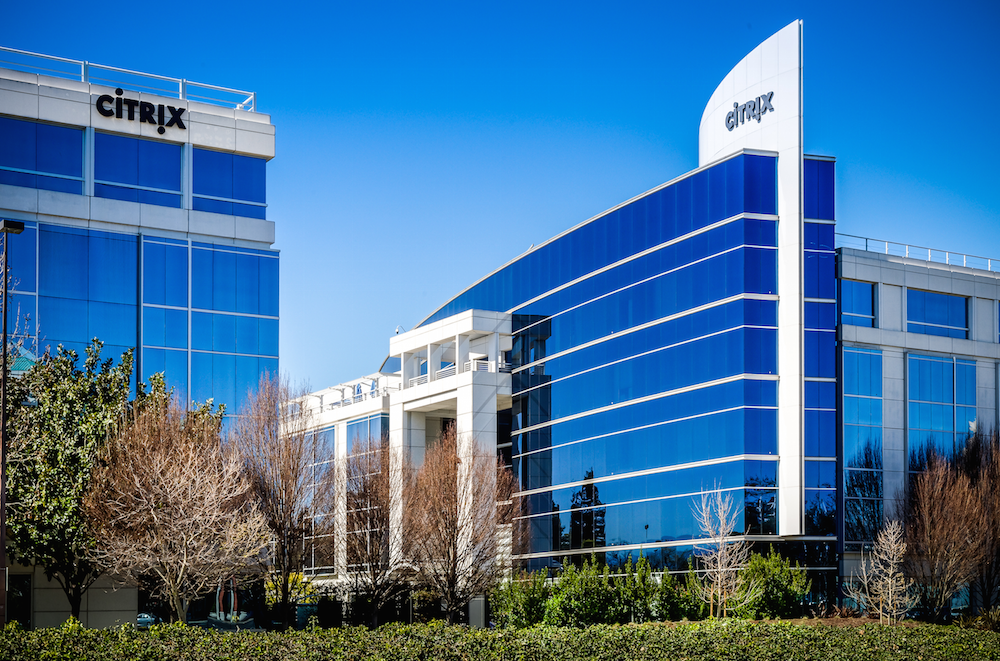
Citrix Systems branch office in Santa Clara, California

Citrix System headquarters 1991–1997

In 2001, Citrix acquired Sequoia Software Corp. for $185 million. That same year, it released MetaFrame XP, a new platform using MetaFrame technology. MetaFrame XP was later rebranded to Presentation Server, in 2005.

On July 9, 2002, Citrix announced a 10% job cut. At the time, the company employed about 1,900 workers. After the announcement, the stock hit a five-year low.

In December 2003, Citrix acquired ExpertCity, a provider of remote desktop products, for $225 million in cash and stock. The acquisition was the company's largest to date. Citrix gained ExpertCity's existing products GoToMyPC and GoToAssist, and ExpertCity became the Citrix Online division. In 2004, the company introduced Citrix GoToMeeting.

Between 2005 and 2012, the company acquired over a dozen companies, allowing it to expand into new markets. Citrix acquired acceleration hardware maker NetScaler in 2005, which allowed the company to offer optimized application delivery. The company entered the server and desktop virtualization market with the purchase of XenSource in August 2007. Citrix expanded its cloud and Infrastructure as a Service (IaaS) offerings in August 2010, with the acquisition of VMLogix. In February 2011, Citrix entered the European Software as a Service (SaaS) market with the acquisition of Netviewer.

In 2007, the company opened a headquarters in Silicon Valley. In 2008, the company rebranded its Presentation Server product line to XenApp. Also in 2008, Citrix announced an expanded alliance with Microsoft on desktop virtualization. On January 29, 2009, Citrix announced that 460 employee positions would be cut, comprising 10% of its workforce. In August 2010, Citrix announced a partnership with Google to bring the company's products to ChromeOS devices. On July 14, 2015, Citrix added full support for Windows 10 to its desktop virtualization products.

In July 2011, the company became an IaaS leader after acquiring Cloud.com, a cloud infrastructure provider, for over $200 million. Citrix began offering VDI-in-a-box to small and medium businesses with the acquisition of Kaviza in May 2011. The company acquired cloud-based file sharing and storage technology through its purchase of ShareFile in October 2011.

In May 2012, Citrix acquired Virtual Computer, a maker of intelligent desktop virtualization. This virtualization technology is used in Citrix's XenClient Enterprise edition. Citrix entered the mobile video and telecom markets in June 2012 when the company acquired ByteMobile. Also in 2012, the company acquired Zenprise. Zenprise's Mobile application management (MAM) technology was released as XenMobile in February 2013.

In January 2014, Citrix acquired Framehawk to improve the delivery of virtual desktops and applications over wireless networks, including cellular, where speed and quality may be poor. In May 2014, Citrix acquired Scalextreme to bolster its cloud capabilities, such as auto scaling, patching, and automation of complex cloud deployments, for its core business units XenDesktop and Xenapp.

On January 29, 2015, Citrix announced that 700 full-time and 200 contractor positions would be eliminated. This was about 10% of its workforce. The cuts were expected to save between $90 and $100 million annually. Two hundred of the layoffs occurred in Fort Lauderdale, Florida, where the company is headquartered.

The company had 10,081 employees as of February 2015. In December 2015, Citrix employed approximately 9,500 people but noted that its November restructure was due to eliminating nearly 700 full-time jobs. As of December 31, 2021, Citrix had approximately 9,700 employees.

=== Recent history ===
Citrix reported a net income of $251.7 million in 2014, down from $339.5 million in 2013. In July 2015, the company announced several changes to its board of directors, including making Robert Calderoni executive chairman and adding Jesse Cohn, a senior partner of activist hedge fund Elliott Management. That same month, the company announced that president and CEO Mark Templeton would retire after a replacement was found. On October 21, the company named its executive chairman, Robert Calderoni, as interim president and CEO.

In January 2016, Kirill Tatarinov, a former Microsoft executive, was named the president and CEO of Citrix and joined the company's board; Calderoni remained executive chairman of the board.

In July 2016, as part of a deal with Boston-based SaaS company LogMeIn, Citrix announced that it had spun off its GoTo product line, which included GoToMeeting, GoToWebinar, GoToWebcast, GoToTraining, GoToAssist and GoToMyPC, into a wholly owned subsidiary called GetGo. In February 2017, Citrix completed a merger through which GetGo became a subsidiary of LogMeIn. The transaction was valued at approximately $1.8 billion. In July 2017, David Henshall became the company's CEO.

Also in 2017, Citrix expanded its partnership with Google. In May, Google announced that it would add support on its Chrome web browser, including graphics processing unit acceleration, to run Citrix XenApp. In July, the companies announced that they were working to allow Citrix Cloud to deploy virtualized apps and desktops on Google Cloud.

In October 2017, Citrix told regulators of plans to lay off staff "across most functions" and consolidate offices in the fall of 2017 into 2018. The company carried out layoffs in Raleigh, North Carolina, and office closures in Santa Barbara, California, and Tempe, Arizona.

Citrix unveiled its Citrix Analytics security software at the 2017 Citrix Synergy conference in Orlando, Florida, in May 2017. The software detects and responds to security threats using artificial intelligence.

Citrix then unveiled Citrix Analytics for Performance at the 2019 Citrix Summit conference in Orlando, Florida, in May 2019. The software quantifies user experience for Virtual applications and desktop users and also leverages machine learning to troubleshoot performance issues.

In 2018, Citrix changed the names of some of its products to represent its shift to a cloud operating model. The company stated that it made the name changes to present a unified product line so that end users can create, manage, and deploy workspaces with apps and data from a single console. The company dropped its Xen and NetScaler brand names: XenApp and XenDesktop became Citrix Virtual Apps and Desktops; XenMobile became Citrix Endpoint Management; ShareFile integration became Citrix Content Collaboration; XenServer became Citrix Hypervisor; Cedexis became Citrix Intelligent Traffic Management; and NetScaler products kept their identities, but the "NetScaler" brand name was replaced with "Citrix ADC" for Application Delivery Controller.

Henshall stepped down in October 2021, and Calderoni was again named interim CEO.

On January 31, 2022, it was announced that Citrix had been acquired in a $16.5 billion deal by affiliates of Vista Equity Partners and Evergreen Coast Capital. Citrix would merge with TIBCO, a Vista portfolio company to form Cloud Software Group (CSG). In July 2022, Citrix announced that Tom Krause would succeed Robert Calderoni as CEO following the merger. It was also reported that Citrix would go private as part of the deal. As part of the merger, in September 2022, Citrix announced a $4.55 billion-equivalent cross-border term loan to back its $16.5 billion buyout by Vista Equity and Evergreen Coast Capital. Following the merger, the Citrix Hypervisor product-line was spun-off into a standalone business unit under CSG and rebranded as XenServer.

In July 2022, Krause became chief executive officer of the Cloud Software Group After Krause joined Cloud Software group it laid off 15 percent of its employees. A year later it laid off an additional 12 percent.

In January 2025, Krause became involved with the U.S. Treasury Department as part of the Department of Government Efficiency (DOGE). He was assigned as a special government employee to review the federal payment system and was granted limited access as a liaison between the Treasury and DOGE. On February 7, 2025, he was appointed as the Fiscal Assistant Secretary of the Treasury, succeeding Matthew Garber who had been acting in the role since David Lebryk's resignation. Krause continued to work at Cloud Software Group despite his employment by DOGE, this has been cited as a potential conflict of interest.

== Operations ==
Citrix is governed by a ten-member board of directors. The company has headquarters in Fort Lauderdale, Florida, with two more U.S. based offices in California and North Carolina. Citrix has research and development centers located in the U.S., Australia, India, Japan, Greece, and the United Kingdom.

Citrix licenses its services and products directly to clients, which include IT professionals and SMEs, and through value-added resellers.

Before going private, Citrix was publicly traded under the ticker symbol CTXS. In 2020, the company ranked 779 on the Fortune 1000 and 1,267 on the Forbes Global 2000. In 2019, Citrix generated $3.01 billion in revenue.

== Acquisitions ==
Citrix has expanded and added new products, technologies, and services through several acquisitions. Its first acquisition was DataPac in 1997, which Citrix purchased in order to utilize DataPac's technology and its position in the Asia-Pacific region. Other major acquisitions include ExpertCity in 2004, NetScaler in 2005, XenSource in 2007, and ShareFile in 2011. As of 2015, Citrix has acquired nearly 50 companies.

In November 2018, Citrix paid $200 million to acquire Sapho, a software startup that develops micro apps for workers. In January 2021, Citrix announced its intention to acquire Wrike for $2.25 billion. The acquisition was completed in March 2021.

== Products ==
Citrix creates software that allows employees to work and collaborate remotely regardless of device or network. The company's main products are in desktop software, Desktop as a Service (DaaS) systems, networking, cloud, and Software as a service (SaaS).

=== Desktops and apps ===
Citrix offers several products related to desktop and application virtualization. These tools allow access to computers and applications independently of what device they are physically using, from any device. Citrix XenApp, now integrated as part of XenDesktop, provides application virtualization. Citrix XenDesktop, Citrix VDI-in-a-Box, and XenClient all provide desktop virtualization. The DesktopPlayer for Mac allows online and offline access to Windows virtual desktops from Macs. Citrix Workspace Cloud is a platform for building and delivering desktops and applications from the cloud. ShareFile allows companies and organizations to sync and share files. XenMobile offers mobile app and device management. Citrix Receiver is a client software that allows universal access to virtual applications and desktops. AppDNA offers software that provides application migration and management. Citrix users interact with the HDX protocol on top of the RDS. This protocol acts as a buffer between the users and the server and compresses data in the meantime.

=== Desktop as a service (DaaS) ===
Citrix technology enables service providers to provide Desktop as a Service (DaaS) offerings, including business apps and desktops, to its customers,. These products include Worx Mobile Apps for secure email, browser, and document sharing, and Citrix Workspace Suite for mobile workspaces.

=== Networking and cloud ===
Citrix products related to cloud computing and networking include Citrix XenServer for server virtualization and its NetScaler brand of network appliances, including WAN optimization devices, Software-Defined WAN delivery equipment, Application Delivery Controllers (ADC), Gateways, and AppFirewall web application firewalls. All of these are managed by Citrix's cloud management software, Citrix Cloud. The company also has ByteMobile Adaptive Traffic Management, which aims to optimize mobile video services through traffic management, policy control, and caching. ByteMobile Insight provides mobile data and subscriber analytics.

=== Software as a service (SaaS) ===
Citrix software as a service (SaaS) products are focused on collaboration and communications. The offerings include Podio, a cloud-based collaboration service, and OpenVoice, which provides audio conferencing.

== Corporate responsibility ==
The company's philanthropic activities include corporate giving—such as corporate donations of in-kind gifts—and employee match programs. In addition, Citrix employees are allowed to take two paid volunteer days each year and participate in the company's annual "Global Day of Impact", an event that encourages Citrix employees to volunteer in their local communities.

Citrix has provided business training to non-profit teams near its Fort Lauderdale headquarters. In particular, the company helped a local non-profit organization launch a computer on wheels to offer training to low-income neighborhoods. In 2007, the company connected a Broward County, Florida, area with Agogo, Ghana, through donated technology and training. Furthermore, the company's Raleigh office began a program called "Project Code" in 2014, which leads Boys & Girls Clubs through coding exercises and teaches them about computer science.

In addition to its philanthropic activities, Citrix has donated some of its open-source technology to non-profit software organizations in order to continue its development and gain more contributors. For example, Citrix gave Cloudstack to the Apache Foundation in 2012 and Xen hypervisor to the Linux Foundation in 2013.

== See also ==
- Nirvana Phone
