= Citrix Virtual Desktops =

Desktop virtualization product

Citrix Virtual Desktops (formerly XenDesktop) is a desktop virtualization product.

== History ==
The virtualization technology that led to XenDesktop was first developed in 2000 through an open-source hypervisor research project led by Ian Pratt at the University of Cambridge called Xen Project for x86. Pratt founded a company called XenSource in 2004, which made a commercial version of the Xen hypervisor. In 2007, Citrix acquired XenSource, releasing XenDesktop version 2.0 in 2008. The company continues to release updated versions, with XenDesktop 7.6 featuring HDX technology enhancements for audio, video and graphics user experience, as well as a reduction in storage costs associated with virtual desktop deployments as a result of improvements to Citrix provisioning services.

In 2018, the software was renamed Citrix Virtual Desktops.

== Overview ==
The product's aim is to give employees the ability to work from anywhere while cutting information technology management costs because desktops and applications are centralized. XenDesktop also aims to provide security, because data is not stored on the devices of end users, instead being saved in a centralized datacenter or cloud infrastructure. Citrix developed the software for use by medium to large enterprise customers.

Citrix Workspace is able to manage and deliver applications and desktops using a connection broker called Desktop Delivery Controller. It supports multiple hypervisors, including Citrix Hypervisor, VMware vSphere, Microsoft Hyper-V and Nutanix Acropolis to create virtual machines to run the applications and desktops. The software allows for several types of delivery methods and is compatible with multiple architectures, including desktops and servers, datacenters, and private, public or hybrid clouds. Virtualized applications can be delivered to virtual desktops using Virtual Apps.

== Release history ==
- Version 7.5 - March 26, 2014
- Version 7.6 - September 30, 2014
- Version 7.6 Feature Pack 1 - March 31, 2015
- Version 7.6 Feature Pack 2 - June 30, 2015
- Version 7.6 Feature Pack 3 - September 30, 2015
- Version 7.6 LTSR - January 11, 2016
- Version 7.7 - December 29, 2015
- Version 7.8 - February 24, 2016
- Version 7.9 - June 1, 2016
- Version 7.11 - September 4, 2016
- Version 7.12 - December 7, 2016
- Version 7.13 - February 23, 2017
- Version 7.14 - May 23, 2017
- Version 7.15 LTSR - August 15, 2017
- Version 7.16 - November, 2017
- Version 7.17 - February, 2018
- Version 7.18 - June, 2018

== See also ==
- EmbeddedXEN, Type-1 (bare metal) hypervisor
