= Citrix Virtual Apps =

Application virtualisation software

- Developer: Citrix
- Stable release: 7.18 (Jun 2018)
- Operating system: Microsoft Windows
- Type: Application virtualization
- License: Proprietary
- Website: Official Webpage

Citrix Virtual Apps (formerly WinFrame, MetaFrame, Presentation Server and XenApp) is an application virtualization software produced by Citrix Systems that allows Windows applications to be accessed via individual devices from a shared server or cloud system.

== Overview ==
Citrix Virtual Apps is application virtualization software that delivers centrally-hosted Windows applications to local devices without the necessity of installing them. It is the flagship product for Citrix and was formerly known under the names WinFrame, MetaFrame, and Presentation Server.

Citrix Virtual Apps software uses FlexCast Management Architecture (FMA), a proprietary architecture for Citrix virtualization products. It delivers individual applications, as opposed to entire desktops, to devices. It is also used with Citrix Workspace to deliver apps as part of a complete virtual desktop environment.

With Citrix Virtual Apps, Windows applications can be used on devices that typically could not run them, including Macintosh computers, mobile devices, Google Chromebooks, and Linux computers. Conversely, it enables otherwise incompatible apps to run on Windows desktops.

Citrix Virtual Apps is accessed on all devices via Citrix Workspace App. The software can be delivered from on-premises data centers or public, private, or hybrid clouds.

== History ==
The precursor to Virtual Apps was called WinFrame, a multi-user operating system based on Windows NT 3.51. Released in 1995, WinFrame was one of the first products distributed by Citrix. At this stage of the product development, Citrix Systems licensed the Windows NT 3.51 base operating system from Microsoft. The core development that Citrix delivered was the MultiWin engine. This allowed multiple users to log on and execute applications on a WinFrame server. Citrix was to later license the MultiWin technology to Microsoft, forming the basis of Microsoft's Terminal Services.

Repackaged versions of Windows 95, with Citrix WinFrame Client included, were also available from Citrix.

MetaFrame superseded WinFrame in 1998. The product was renamed several times: it became MetaFrame XP in 2002, MetaFrame XP Presentation Server in 2003, and then was rebranded as Presentation Server in 2005. Each of these products focused on remote access of applications and server-based computing.

In 2008, the product was renamed XenApp. The "Xen" was taken from the company's acquisition of XenSource in 2007.

Between 2010 and 2012, Citrix issued two updates of XenApp. XenApp 6 launched in 2010 and included a new central management console called AppCenter. In 2012, XenApp 6.5 was released and this update included a new feature called Instant App Access, which aimed to reduce application launch time.

In 2013, version 7.0 was released. This update combined XenDesktop and XenApp into one application called XenDesktop under the Flex Management Architecture (FMA). Prior to this, all versions of XenApp used the company's Independent Management Architecture (IMA). In 2014, version 7.5 was released as XenApp, separate from XenDesktop, but it was also built on FMA.

In 2018, XenApp was rebranded Citrix Virtual Apps.

More recently, Citrix has introduced a cloud-based solution known as Citrix DaaS, which it positions as a successor to its on-premise Citrix Virtual Apps and Desktops (CVAD) offering. However, it is still releasing new Virtual Apps and Desktops versions, to meet the needs of customers who prefer or require an on-premise solution.
