= List of mergers and acquisitions by Citrix =

Citrix Systems is an American computer software company that was founded in 1989 by Ed Iacobucci. Citrix creates and sells virtualization, cloud computing, networking and SaaS products that aim to provide remote connectivity to workers on a variety of devices.

The company's first acquisition was DataPac in 1997, which Citrix purchased in order to utilize DataPac's technology and its position in the Asia-Pacific region. Key acquisitions that contributed to the company's expansion include ExpertCity in 2004, NetScaler in 2005, XenSource in 2007 and ShareFile in 2011. As of 2015, Citrix had acquired nearly 50 companies.

== Mergers and acquisitions ==
No.	Acquired	Company	Business	Country	Derived products	References
1	September 1997	DataPac Australasia	Server-based computing	AUS	Citrix WinFrame	
2	March 1998	Insignia NTrigue	Server-based computing and consumer electronics	USA	Citrix WinFrame	
3	June 1998	APM Ltd.	Java developer	GBR	Citrix WinFrame and MetaFrame	
4	July 1998	VDOnet	Internet film broadcasting	ISR	Video/audio server technology	
5	July 1999	Viewsoft	Software developer for web-based application	USA	Application Linking and Embedding (ALE) software	
6	February 2000	Innovex Group	Internet consulting company	USA	Citrix Worldwide Customer Service	
7	May 2001	Sequoia Software Corporation	XML-based portal software developer	USA	Citrix NFuse and Metaframe	
8	March 2004	Expertcity	GoToMyPC and GoToMeeting platform developer	USA	SaaS	
9	December 2004	Net6	SSL VPN technology	USA	SSL Access Gateway and Citrix’s MetaFrame Access Suite	
10	August 2005	Netscaler	Application acceleration hardware vendor	USA	Citrix NetScaler	
11	November 2005	Teros	Firewall vendor	USA	Citrix NetScaler Application Firewall	
12	May 2006	Reflectent	Edgesight desktop applications performance-monitoring software developer.	USA	Citrix Web applications performance-measuring software, core client-server applications, Presentation Server	
13	August 2006	Orbital Data	WAN optimization	USA	Citrix WANScaler	
14	January 2007	Ardence Inc.	Server provisioning software developer	USA	Citrix’s Management Systems Group, Provisioning Server	
15	March 2007	thinGenius	Load testing software	USA	Presentation Server and virtual software delivery	
16	February 2007	Aurema	Processor workload monitoring and management software developer	AUS	Greater support for Presentation Server running on Microsoft Longhorn Server	
17	June 2007	Caymas Systems	Identity-based access control	USA	Citrix SSL VPN (enhanced)	
18	September 2007	QuickTree	XML security	USA	NetScaler application-acceleration platform, WANScaler WAN-optimization gear, and Citrix Access Gateway SSL VPN device	
19	October 2007	XenSource	Desktop and server virtualization	GBR	Desktop and server virtualization. XenSource became part of Citrix’s Virtualization & Management Division.	
20	May 2008	sepagoPROFILE	Profile management technology developer	GER	Citrix XenDesktop, XenApp, and User Profile Manager	
21	March 2008	Deterministics Network	Software-based scalable secure network acceleration and bandwidth management	USA	Citrix Deterministics Network	
22	2009	Vidsoft	High definition video streaming	GER	HDFaces within GoToMeeting, GoToWebinar, and GoToTraining	
23	November 2008	Vapps	High definition audio conference call equipment	USA	GoToMeeting	
24	February 2010	Paglo Labs	SaaS-based IT management	USA	GoToManage	
25	August 2010	VMLogix Inc.	Virtualization automation and management	USA	XenServer	
26	February 2011	Netviewer	SaaS vendor in collaboration and IT services	GER	Citrix’s online services division	
27	February 2011	EMS-Cortex	Cloud services provisioning and management	NZ	XenApp, Cloud Portal Services Manager	
28	May 2011	Kaviza	Virtual desktop infrastructure (VDI) developer	USA	VDI-in-a-box	
29	July 2011	Cloud.com	Cloud computing	USA	Citrix CloudPlatform OpenStack, open source cloud stack	
30	August 2011	RingCube	Personalized virtual desktop	USA	XenDesktop	
31	October 2011	ShareFile	Enterprise file-sharing solution	USA	ShareFile	
32	October 2011	App-DNA	Software migration	EU	Citrix Desktop Transformation Model	
33	February 2012	Apere	Network security	USA	Software as a service (SaaS), Single sign-on Security (SSO)	
34	April 2012	Podio	Cloud-based social network for businesses	DEN	GoTo cloud services	
35	May 2012	Virtual Computer	Virtual desktop technology	USA	XenClient	
36	July 2012	Bytemobile	Mobile data and video optimization	USA	NetScaler	
37	September 2012	Beetil	Cloud-based service desk technology provider	NZ	GoToAssist	
38	January 2013	Zenprise	Mobile device management	USA	XenMobile	
39	September 2013	Byte Squared	iPad document editing	GBR	ShareFile	
40	December 2013	Skytide	iPad document editing	GBR	ByteMobile	
41	January 2014	FrameHawk	Mobile delivery of virtual desktop	USA	HDX technology for XenApp and XenDesktop	
42	May 2014	ScaleXtreme	Application management	USA	Workspace Services	
43	August 2014	Virtual	Android and IOS virtualization	USA	Enterprise mobility products	
44	October 2014	RightSignature	Online signing tools	USA	ShareFile	
45	November 2014	Solid Instance	Microsoft Windows virtual application delivery	USA	Virtual desktop delivery	
46	December 2014	Octoblu	Networking	USA	Citrix Octoblu	
47	January 2015	Sanbolic	Storage virtualization	USA	Melio	
48	April 2015	Grasshopper	Telephone services	USA	GoToMeeting, GoToTraining, GoToWebinar, ShareFile, and OpenVoice	
49	September 2016	Norskale	UEM and application performance optimization	FRA	XenApp, XenDesktop	
50	January 2017	Unidesk		USA	XenApp, XenDesktop	
51	February 2018	Cedexis	Intelligent traffic management	FRA	Citrix ITM	
52	March 2021	Wrike	Project management	USA	Citrix Workspace	
53	January 2025	Unicon	Thin Client OS Vendor	GER		

== See also ==
- Lists of corporate acquisitions and mergers
