= Comparison of web conferencing software =

This list is a comparison of web conferencing software available for Linux, macOS, and Windows platforms. Many of the applications support the use of videoconferencing.

== Comparison chart ==
Program	License	Capacity	Linux	macOS	Microsoft Windows	Audio Support	Video Support	Video Quality	Chat Support	Desktop Sharing Support	Whiteboard	Upload PPT	Upload PDF	Upload Doc/DocX	Co-browsing	Mobile Device Support	Break-Out rooms	Security Access	Encrypted communication	Host meeting from Mobile	Attend meeting from Mobile	Screen share from Mobile	Cloud Based	Recording capabilities	VoIP	Embeddable	Dial in
Adobe Connect	Proprietary	1–1,500 (80,000 w/webcast)	Partial	Yes	Yes	Yes (Note: Supports two-way teleconference integration)	Yes	1080p, 360°	Yes	Yes (Note: Linux users may only view another user's desktop)	Yes	Yes	Yes	No	Yes (Note: Yes, but only via a screen-sharing "pod" with control permissions granted)	✓ iPhone, iPad, and Android	Yes	Yes	Yes	Yes	iOS, Android and RIM	?	Yes	Yes	Yes	No	Yes
alfaview	Proprietary	1–500	Yes	Yes	Yes	Yes	Yes	HQ	Yes	Yes	Yes	No	No	No	No	Yes	Yes	Yes	Yes	Yes	Yes	?	One-time download	No	Yes	Yes	No
AT&T Connect	Proprietary	1–1,500	Yes (Note: Web based client without the ability to share)	Yes	Yes	Yes	Yes	HQ	Yes	Yes	Yes	Yes	Yes	Yes	Yes	Yes	Yes	Yes	Yes	Yes	iOS, Android, RIM and Windows Phone	?	Yes	Yes	?	?	?
AnyMeeting	Proprietary	1–200	No	Yes	Yes	Yes	Yes	HQ	Yes	Yes	No	Yes	Yes	Yes	No	✓ iPad and Android Tablets	No	Yes	Yes	No	iOS and Android Tablets	?	Yes	Yes	?	?	?
BigBlueButton	LGPL, GPL	1–150+	Yes	Yes	Yes	Yes	Yes	VGA, HQ	Yes	Yes	Yes	Yes	Yes	Yes	Yes	Yes	Yes	Yes	Yes	Yes	Yes	?	Yes	Yes	Yes	Yes	Yes
Cisco WebEx	Proprietary	1–3,000	Yes	Yes	Yes	Yes	Yes	VGA, HQ, HD	Yes	Yes	Yes	Yes	Yes	Yes	Yes	Yes	Yes	Yes	✓ 256-bit AES,PKI,End-to-end (Transport layer: 128-bit SSLv3)	✓ iOS devices, Android, and BlackBerry	Yes	?	Yes	✓ Computer-based and server-based	Yes	?	Yes
Conference XP	Apache License 2.0	?	No	No	Yes	Yes	Yes	Full HD	Yes	?	Yes	?	?	?	Yes	?	?	?	?	?	?	?	?	Yes	?	?	?
Discord	Proprietary	50	Yes	Yes	Yes	Yes	Yes	HD, 1080p	Yes	Yes	?	Yes	Yes	Yes	?	Yes	?	?	?	Yes	Yes	?	?	?	Yes	?	?
GoTo Meeting	Proprietary	1–1,000	Yes	Yes	Yes	Yes	Yes	HD	Yes	Yes	Yes	Yes	Yes	Yes	Yes	Yes	Yes	Yes	Yes	Yes	Yes	Yes	Yes	Yes	Yes	Yes	Yes
Facebook Messenger Rooms	Proprietary	1–50																									
FreeConferenceCall	Proprietary	1–1,000	Yes	Yes	Yes	Yes	Yes	HD	Yes	Yes	Yes	Yes	Yes	Yes	Yes	Yes	Yes	Yes	✓ 256-bit AES,PKI,End-to-end (Transport layer: 128-bit SSLv3)	✓ iOS devices, Android, and BlackBerry	Yes	Yes	Yes	✓ Computer-based and server-based	Yes	Yes	Yes
Fuze Meeting	Proprietary	1–1,000	Partial	Yes	✓ (Vista, 7 & 8)	Yes	Yes	HD, QVGA	Yes	Yes	Yes	Yes	Yes	Yes	Yes	✓ Blackberry, iPhone, iPad, Android Phone, Android Tablet	No	Yes	Yes	Yes	Yes	?	Yes	Yes	Yes	?	Yes
Genesys Meeting Center	Proprietary	125+	Yes	Yes	Yes	Yes	Yes	VGA	Yes	Yes	?	Yes	No	?	Yes	Yes	Yes	Yes	Yes	?	Yes	?	Yes	Yes	?	?	?
Galene	MIT Licence	1-1000	Yes	Yes	Yes	Yes	Yes	HD	Yes	Yes	No	No	No	No	No	Yes	Yes	Yes	Yes	Yes	Yes	Yes	Yes	Yes	Yes	Yes	Yes
Google Meet	Proprietary	100–1000	Yes	Yes	Yes	Yes	Yes	HD	Yes	Yes	No	Yes	Yes	Yes	No	Yes	Yes	Yes	Yes	Yes	Yes	?	Yes	Yes	?	?	Yes
HCL Sametime	Proprietary	?	Yes	Yes	Yes	Yes	Yes	VGA, HQ, HD (H.264)	Yes	Yes	Yes	Yes	Yes	Yes	Yes	Yes	Yes	Yes	Yes	Yes	Yes	?	Yes	Yes	?	?	?
iMeet	Proprietary	Up to 125	Partial	Yes	Yes	Yes	Yes	HD	Yes	Yes	No	Yes	Yes	Yes	No	Yes	No	Yes	Yes	Yes	Yes	?	Yes	Yes	?	?	?
InterCall Unified Meeting (IUM)	Proprietary	125+	Partial	Yes	Yes	Yes	Yes	VGA	Yes	Yes	?	Yes	No	?	Yes	Yes	Yes	Yes	Yes	Yes	Yes	?	Yes	Yes	?	?	Yes
Jami	GNU General Public License	1–8	Yes	Yes	Yes	Yes	Yes	VGA, HQ, HD (H.264), HEVC (H.265)	Yes	Yes	?	?	?	?	?	✓ iOS and Android	?	Yes	Yes	Yes	iOS and Android	?	?	Yes	?	?	?
Jitsi Meet	Apache License	1-1000+	Yes	Yes	Yes	Yes	Yes	VGA, HQ, HD (H.264)	Yes	Yes	Yes	No	No	No	Yes	✓ iOS and Android	Yes	Yes	Yes	Yes	iOS and Android	?	Yes	Yes	Yes	Yes	Yes
Lifesize	Proprietary	1–300 (10,000 webinar)	No	Yes	Yes	Yes	Yes	HQ	Yes	Yes	Yes	Yes	Yes	Yes	No	Yes	Yes	Yes	Yes	Yes	Yes	?	Yes	Yes	Yes	Yes	Yes
Microsoft Live Meeting (discontinued)	Proprietary	?	Yes	Yes	Yes	Yes	Yes	VGA, HQ	Yes	Yes	Yes	Yes	Yes	Yes	Yes	No	Yes	Yes	Yes	No	No	?	Partial	Yes	?	?	?
Microsoft Teams	Proprietary	10?, 250–10,000 (250–10,000 paid)	Yes	Yes	Yes	Yes	Yes	VGA, HQ, HD	Yes	Yes	Yes	Yes	Yes	Yes	No	Yes	Yes	Yes	Yes	?	iOS, Android, WebRTC	?	Partial	✓ (Paid)	?	?	✓ (paid; add-on)
Mikogo	Proprietary	1–25	Yes	Yes	Yes	Yes	No	No	Yes	Yes	Yes	?	?	?	?	Yes	?	Yes	Yes	No	Yes	?	Yes	Yes	?	?	?
Netviewer	Proprietary	1–100	No	No	Yes	Yes	Yes	VGA	Yes	Yes	?	?	?	?	?	No	?	Yes	No	?	?	?	?	?	?	?	?
omNovia Web Conference	Proprietary	2–5,000	Yes	Yes	Yes	Yes	Yes	VGA	Yes	Yes	Yes	Yes	Yes	Yes	Yes	Yes	?	No	No	?	Yes	?	Yes	Yes	?	?	?
OpenMeetings	Apache License	1–125	Yes	Yes	Yes	Yes	Yes	VGA	Yes	Yes	Yes	Yes	Yes	Yes	Yes	?	?	No	Yes	?	?	?	?	Yes	?	?	?
PowWow365	Proprietary	1–500	Yes	Yes	Yes	Yes	No	No	Yes	Yes	Yes	Yes	Yes	Yes	Yes	Yes	Yes	Yes	Yes	Yes	iOS (iPhone, iPad)	?	Yes	Yes	?	?	?
Slack	Proprietary	1 to 50	Partial	Yes	Yes	Yes	Yes	VGA, HQ, HD	Yes	Yes	No	Yes	Yes	Yes	No	Yes	?	Yes	Yes	Yes	Yes	?	No	Yes	?	?	?
Skype	Proprietary	1 to 50	Partial (Note: Requires installation of closed-source software.)	Yes	Yes	Yes	Yes	VGA, HQ, HD	Yes	Yes	No	Yes	Yes	Yes	No	Yes	?	Yes	Yes	Yes	Yes	?	No	Yes	?	?	?
Skype for Business (discontinued)	Proprietary	1 to 1,000 (10,000 webinar)	No	Yes	Yes	Yes	Yes	VGA, HQ, HD	Yes	Yes	Yes	Yes	Yes	Yes	Yes	Yes	?	Yes	Yes	Yes	Yes	?	Partial	Yes	Yes	?	Yes
StarLeaf	Proprietary	1–300 (Unlimited streaming audience)	Partial	Yes	Yes	Yes	Yes	HD	Yes	Yes	No	Yes	Yes	Yes	No	Yes	No	Yes	Yes	Yes	Yes	?	Yes	Yes	Yes	?	Yes
TeamViewer	Proprietary	1–25	Yes	Yes	Yes	Yes	Yes	VGA	Yes	Yes	?	Yes (Note: Any upload possible)	Yes	?	Yes	Yes	No	Yes	Yes	?	?	?	?	?	?	?	?
TrueConf	Proprietary	1–1,000	Yes	Yes	Yes	Yes	Yes	Ultra HD	Yes	Yes	Yes	Yes	Yes	No	Yes	Yes	Yes	Yes	Yes	iOS, Android, WebRTC	iOS, Android, WebRTC	?	Yes	Yes	Yes	Yes	Yes
VenueGen	Proprietary	1–500	No	No	Yes	Yes	Yes	VGA	Yes	Yes	?	Yes	Yes	?	Yes	No	No	No	No	?	?	?	?	?	?	?	?
VideoMost	Proprietary	1–250 (+1,500 video broadcast)	Yes	Yes	Yes	Yes	Yes	HD, Full HD, Ultra HD (4K)	Yes	Yes	Yes	Yes	Yes	Yes	Yes	✓ iPad, Android Phones & Tablets	Yes	Yes	Yes	Yes	iPad, Android Phones & Tablets	?	Yes	Yes	Yes	API VideoMost	?
WizIQ	Proprietary	Up to 1,999	Yes	Yes	Yes	Yes	Yes	VGA, HQ, HD	Yes	Yes	Yes	Yes	Yes	Yes	No	Yes	Yes	Yes	Yes	Yes	Yes	?	Yes	Yes	Yes	API Web Services	?
Yuuguu	Proprietary	1–30	Yes	Yes	Yes	No	No	No	Yes	Yes	?	No	No	?	No	No	Yes	?	Yes	No	Yes	?	?	?	?	?	?
Zoho	Proprietary	1–250 (5,000 webinar)	Yes	Yes	Yes	Yes	Yes	HD	Yes	Yes	Yes	Yes	Yes	Yes	No	Yes	Yes	Yes	Yes	Yes	Yes	Yes	Yes	Yes	Yes	Yes	Yes
Zoom	Proprietary	50–500 (10,000 webinar)	Partial	Yes	Yes	Yes	Yes	HD	Yes	Yes	Yes	Yes	Yes	Yes	Yes	Yes	Yes	Yes	Yes	Yes	Yes	?	One-time download	Yes	Yes	?	Yes
Program	License	Capacity	Linux	macOS	Microsoft Windows	Audio Support	Video Support	Video Quality	Chat Support	Desktop Sharing Support	Whiteboard	Upload PPT	Upload PDF	Upload Doc/DocX	Co-browsing	Mobile Device Support	Break-Out rooms	Security Access	Encrypted communication	Host meeting from Mobile	Attend meeting from Mobile	Screen share from Mobile	Cloud Based	Recording capabilities	VoIP	Embeddable	Dial in

== Terminology ==
In the table above, the following terminology is intended to be used to describe some important features:

- Audio Support: the remote control software transfers audio signals across the network and plays the audio through the speakers attached to the local computer. For example, music playback software normally sends audio signals to the locally attached speakers, via some sound controller hardware. If the remote control software package supports audio transfer, the playback software can run on the remote computer, while the music can be heard from the local computer, as though the software were running locally.
- Co-Browsing: the navigation of the Web by several people accessing the same web pages at the same time. When session leader clicks on a link, all other users are transferred to the new page. Co-browsers should support multiple frames and support embedded multimedia (e.g., if a page contains a video player, the session leader may commence synchronized playback for all users. Passing URLs via other tools such as a chat or phone and entering them into browser by each user is not considered co-browsing.
- File Transfer: the software allows the user to transfer files between the local and remote computers, from within the client program's user interface.
- Unified Communications (UC) is a marketing buzzword describing the integration of real-time, enterprise, communication services such as instant messaging (chat), presence information, voice (including IP telephony), mobility features (including extension mobility and single number reach), audio, web & video conferencing, fixed-mobile convergence (FMC), desktop sharing, data sharing (including web connected electronic interactive whiteboards), call control and speech recognition with non-real-time communication services such as unified messaging (integrated voicemail, e-mail, SMS and fax). UC is not necessarily a single product, but a set of products that provides a consistent unified user-interface and user-experience across multiple devices and media-types.
