= Citrix Online =

Online services division of Citrix Systems

- Type: Subsidiary
- Industry: Software
- Founded: 1997 in Santa Barbara, California
- Founder: UCSB Professor Klaus Schauser and graduate students Bernd Oliver Christiansen and Malte Muenke
- Defunct: July 26, 2016
- Fate: Merged with LogMeIn
- Successor: LogMeIn
- Headquarters: Santa Barbara, California
- Products: Thin Client Software, Remote Access, Online Collaboration and Web Conferencing, Remote Support
- Services: Remote Access, Online Collaboration and Web Conferencing, Remote Support
- Parent: LogMeIn
- Website: www.citrixonline.com

Citrix Online was the name of the online services division of Citrix Systems. Citrix Online sold web-based remote access, support, and collaboration software and services. Its products are GoToAssist, GoToMeeting, GoToMyPC, GoToTraining, GoToWebinar, Podio, and OpenVoice. Citrix Online used the software as a service (SaaS) and application service provider (ASP) software business models.

Citrix Online started as "Expertcity, Inc." in 1997 and was acquired by Citrix Systems in 2003, subsequently changing its name to "Citrix Online". Citrix Online was renamed to Citrix's SaaS division in 2014, and Citrix Mobility Apps Business Unit in 2015. In November 2015 Citrix announced it would be spun off into a new standalone company.

In July 2016, it was announced that the new company, consisting of the Citrix Online collaboration products (the "GoTo family" of products), would be merged with the business operations of LogMeIn, Inc during the first quarter of 2017. The merger occurred on January 31, 2017 with Citrix shareholders owning 50.1% of the stock of the new LogMeIn and LogMeIn shareholders owning 49.9% of the stock of the merged company. The combined company was headquartered in Boston, Massachusetts, and led by executives of both LogMeIn and Citrix Online.

== History ==
The core technologies that would become Citrix Online were originally built by the company Expertcity. Expertcity, Inc. was founded in 1997 by University of California, Santa Barbara professor Klaus Schauser and graduate students Bernd Oliver Christiansen and Malte Muenke. Investors included Sun Microsystems, ZDNet, Bertelsmann Ventures, and Wit Capital.

The company announced a web-based marketplace for technical support services, called Expertcity, in December, 1999. A user of the service would submit a technical support question through a simple webform and receive Dutch auction bids from online experts to resolve the problem. Upon selecting one of the experts, the user would be connected to him via a chat interface and, optionally, via desktop sharing, whereby the expert could see the user's screen and remotely control the user's mouse and keyboard. This "remote desktop" technology formed the kernel of later products for Citrix Online.

Expertcity discontinued their support marketplace service on January 1, 2002 by transferring it to Tech24, Inc. Tech24 subsequently phased out the service and transitioned to phone-based support.

The remote desktop technology behind the support marketplace enabled additional products. June 2000 saw the debut of DesktopStreaming (now GoToAssist), a product that lets companies use desktop sharing for technical support between their own customers and support representatives. GoToMyPC, which allows a user to remotely access his or her own desktop, followed in early 2001.

Since 2009, Citrix Online had several layoffs. That year, following the lead of Citrix Systems, Citrix Online laid off 10% of its employees. In 2014, Citrix Online cut 65 workers, largely concentrated in marketing. In November 2015, Citrix announced plans to spin off its SaaS division, Citrix Online, and cut an unspecified number of employees. Chris Hylen was announced as the new CEO of the spinoff.

In 2018, the entire tech support staff was outsourced to Costa Rica resulting in a large number of US-based layoffs.

== Acquisitions ==
In 2003, Citrix Systems acquired Expertcity, then a major player in web-based desktop access, in a transaction valued at approximately $225 million in cash and stock. Expertcity became the Citrix Online division of Citrix and retained many of the key developers of the original company.

At the time of the acquisition, Expertcity was developing GoToMeeting, a product that uses the remote desktop engine to allow multiple users to view and control a single desktop, enabling both collaborative support and collaborative presentations. In 2006, Citrix Online adapted GoToMeeting to support the growing market for web-based training and web-based seminars. The resulting GoToWebinar product and the GoToTraining product that launched in 2010 allow hundreds of attendees to view a single screen and join in a phone conference.

In 2008, Citrix acquired Vapps, Inc., an audio conferencing provider, and created Citrix Online Audio, LLC. Shortly after, they released HiDef Corporate, a flat-rate, hosted audio conferencing service.

In 2010, Citrix acquired Paglo Labs and released GoToManage, an IT management and support tool. GoToManage became part of GoToAssist in 2012.

In 2012, Citrix acquired Podio, a collaborative work platform for cloud collaboration.

In 2015, Citrix acquired Grasshopper, a virtual phone system provider.

== Products ==
=== Current ===
- GoToAssist (formerly DesktopStreaming) — services for businesses to facilitate remote technical support and monitoring for IT environments
- GoToMeeting — collaboration and meetings with up to 250 attendees
- GoToMyPC — remote desktop access for individuals and medium & large enterprises
- GoToTraining — training and development with up to 200 attendees
- GoToWebinar — seminars and presentations with up to 1000 attendees
- Podio — collaborative work platform to manage and collaborate on any project or business process
- OpenVoice (formerly HiDef Corporate) — audio conferencing with web- and mobile-based administration and control
- RightSignature - digital signatures straight through email.

=== Discontinued ===
- BuddyHelp — desktop sharing for individuals to facilitate remote technical support
- ExpertLive (formerly Expertcity) — technical support marketplace
- GoView—Screen recording solution
- Talkboard — Collaborative whiteboard app for iPad. Won Apple’s App Store “Best of 2013” award in the Business Productivity category.
