= Dan Engel =

Software Entrepreneur and Venture Capitalist

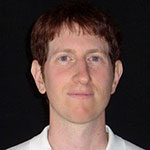
- Born: Daniel Conrad Engel; June 5, 1976 (age 50); The Bronx, New York, U.S.
- Education: Tulane University (B.S.)
- Occupation: Entrepreneur
- Spouse: Emily Anne Engel

Daniel Conrad Engel (born June 5, 1976) is an American CEO and entrepreneur who has worked in the e-commerce and software industries since 1997.

Engel led customer acquisition at Picasa, Google, FastSpring, GoToMeeting and GoToMyPC. In 2020, Engel founded Santa Barbara Venture Partners, a venture capital investment fund. He graduated from Tulane University in 1998 with a major in finance and is a past member of Young Presidents' Organization. Engel sits on multiple boards of directors and advisers to tech companies. Since 2018, he has served as board member on a range of local nonprofits that address the critical issue of homelessness. Engel lives in Santa Barbara, California with his two children and his wife, Emily, an environmental activist, art historian, and lecturer at the University of California, Santa Barbara.

== Career ==
In 2000, at the age of 24, Engel served as an Entrepreneur-in-Residence at Idealab, the leading incubator of the dot com era, after having started GrapeApe.com, a consumer e-commerce company, while in college.

From 2002 to 2003, Engel led customer acquisition/revenue generation for GoToMyPC and GoToMeeting software. Revenue growth over the two-year period help lead to a $225M acquisition by Citrix in 2003. In 2014, the Citrix Online division generated over $600 million in revenue as the #3 global SaaS company.

Starting in September 2003, Engel was VP of Market Development at Picasa, a digital photo consumer software company. Engel led Picasa's customer acquisition, marketing and business development initiatives, again significantly boosting revenues.

After Google acquired Picasa in 2004, Engel joined Google and led online customer acquisition/advertising for Google’s AdSense and AdWords products, through Google’s 2004 IPO.

From 2005 to 2013, Engel was CEO and co-founder of FastSpring, an e-payment platform for 3,000+ desktop software and SaaS companies worldwide. Engel grew FastSpring's revenue from zero to over $100 million with $30,000 in total investment. Known for its customer service, FastSpring (acquired 2013 and again in 2018 by Accel-KKR) had a very low annual churn rate of 1.3%. It was the fastest-growing company in the Greater LA area during 2006-2010, according to Deloitte, 13th fastest-growing in N. America during that time, and ranked 41 and 53 on the Inc 500 for 2010 and 2011. While CEO at FastSpring, Engel led corporate sales, marketing and finance. The founders and original investors in FastSpring earned more than a 600-fold return on their original investment.

In 2015, Engel co-founded Mobile1st, serving as its first CEO. The principal product of Mobile1st was Mobilizer Mobile Performance Platform, which enabled companies to manage, monitor, and improve their mobile web page performance across popular mobile devices. Mobile1st now focuses on improving mobile conversion rate for e-commerce companies.

In 2020, Engel launched Santa Barbara Venture Partners (SBVP), a venture capital investment fund that helps its portfolio companies with marketing and customer acquisition. SBVP employs strict guidelines for most companies in which it invests. Those criteria include: the company must have "already conquered product-market fit and [be] generating at least $3 million in annual revenue." By June 2022, SBVP had invested in nine firms, with its support averaging $850,000 per investment.

In 2024, SBVP employed a strategy for producing profitability for investors far in an advance of any selling of its investments (or "exit") that might occur in the future. Featured in the Wall Street Journal, the firm's strategy entailed selling either in the secondary market or into a new investment round a small portion of one or more of its already-profitable investments and then returning those profits to investors. For instance, in March of 2024, SBVP sold one tenth of its holdings in Rad AI, a software platform helping automate radiology reports using generative AI. From this early exit, SBVP gained a gross return on investment of 142 percent.

Prior to building start-ups, Engel's business passion was the investment management industry. Starting in high school with Smith Barney, he had a variety of internships. Following Smith Barney, he worked with Sanford C. Bernstein (today Alliance Bernstein), creating their first website. At the age of 19, Engel sought out and learned from legendary investor Philip L. Carret, founder of one of the first mutual funds in 1928. During college, he interned for four years at Merrill Lynch, working along Jim Mangum, a veteran value investor who became his mentor. Later, at Fidelity Investments' Fund Management and Research Company (FMR), Engel worked with some of the industry's investment industry legends, including Ned Johnson, Peter Lynch, William Danoff, and others.
