= Crossloop =

Remote desktop service

CrossLoop
- Developer: CrossLoop Inc.
- Final release: 2.82 / January 19, 2012; 14 years ago
- Operating system: Windows, macOS, Android
- Type: Remote administration
- License: GPL, proprietary software
- Website: www.crossloop.com

CrossLoop was a remote desktop service from CrossLoop Inc., which allowed users to share their computer screens and collaborate with others over the Internet.

On July 6, 2012, AVG Technologies acquired CrossLoop Inc., and on January 31, 2014 it shut down the www.crossloop.com website and all former CrossLoop Inc. services, including its remote control screen sharing software products. AVG Technologies did not give a reason for this shut down, only commenting that it was a business decision.

== Software Products ==
- CrossLoop Pro – subscription-based collection of tools for remote access and customer management
- CrossLoop Remote Access – subscription-based remote access software
- CrossLoop Free – A free screen-sharing and collaboration tool.

== Marketplace Service ==
The CrossLoop Marketplace was a place where people could get remote IT support 24 hours a day from a global network of experts through secure screen sharing technology. Individuals and businesses could get assistance with computers, mobile devices, peripherals, software and training.

On January 31, 2014, this service was shut down by AVG Technologies.

== Technology ==
UltraVNC (formerly used TightVNC) on Windows and Chicken of the VNC on a Macintosh is used to establish a connection between computers, and a separate application to handle the billing of services between the two endpoints. CrossLoop encrypts the data sent across the computers. Data is encrypted using a 128-bit Blowfish encryption algorithm. The service might work even if one or both of the computers are behind a firewall.

== Competitors ==
- RealVNC
- Splashtop Business & Enterprise
- LogMeIn
- GoToMyPC
- GoToAssist
- TeamViewer
- Bomgar

== See also ==
- Tom Rolander
- Comparison of remote desktop software
- Remote Desktop Protocol (RDP)
- Terminal Services
- Virtual Network Computing (VNC)
