= Netviewer =

German IT company

Netviewer AG
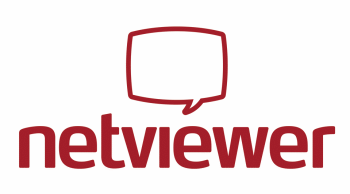
- Type: Public corporation
- Industry: Information Technology
- Founded: 2001
- Headquarters: Karlsruhe, Germany
- Key people: Robert Gratzl; Jörg Mayer; Lars Thomas
- Products: Netviewer GoToMeeting, Netviewer GoToAssist, Netviewer GoToAssist Corporate
- Number of employees: ~200+ (April 2009)

Netviewer AG was a German IT company headquartered in Karlsruhe. The company's software products provided web conferencing, desktop sharing, and remote maintenance capabilities.

== History ==
Netviewer was founded in 2001. In 2002, the firm won a competition for startup companies sponsored by German savings banks and McKinsey Consulting's German branch. In 2011, Netviewer was acquired by Citrix Systems under the division Citrix Online.

== Products ==
Netviewer products focused on desktop sharing between two or more computers over the Internet and allowing the exchange of screen contents. Netviewer provided the following products:

- Meets, webconferencing
- Support; help desk and IT support
- Admin; remote access
- Present; webcasting.

Netviewer Meet was available as freeware for private users and as software-as-a-service or on-premises licensing models for commercial use. The other products are available as software-as-a service or on-premises licenses exclusively.

After the acquisition of Netviewer, two different products, GoToMeeting for web conferencing and GoToAssist for remote access, were released. No free versions were available; only trial versions.

== Security ==
Netviewer products use 256-bit AES encryption and key-phrase-based authentication. and the software's security has been certified by Fraunhofer certified the software security in April 2004.

== See also ==
- GoTo (US company) – currently company with the legacy of these products
- Web conferencing
- Comparison of web conferencing software
- Collaborative software
