= VenueGen =

Former web conferencing service

- Type: Private
- Industry: Telecommunications software and services
- Founded: 2007
- Fate: Defunct
- Headquarters: Research Triangle Park, North Carolina (United States)
- Website: www.venuegen.com

VenueGen was a browser-based web conferencing service created and marketed by The Venue Network. It was a 3D virtual meeting software that enables users to interact with each other using avatars. Users could host and attend meetings, conferences, and training with other colleagues and upload rich media into virtual meeting rooms for real-time collaboration.

== History ==
In 2007, VenueGen was founded by business entrepreneur David Gardner. The virtual meeting software was developed by The Venue Network in Research Triangle Park, North Carolina, and became commercially available in early 2010. The VenueGen business application has been compared to Second Life's virtual meeting spaces. Its main web conferencing competitors wereWebEx, Fuze Meeting, and Dimdim.

== Technology ==
Users share multiple documents on a large display screen in one of VenueGen's virtual rooms.

VenueGen was software as a service (SaaS) that was built on a MMO engine and ran 3D graphics technology. It was a browser-based plug-in that was available as a download once logged on the VenueGen website. The software application ran on Windows XP, Windows Vista, Windows 7, and Mac OS X operating systems and was compatible with browsers Mozilla Firefox 2.0 or above and Microsoft Internet Explorer 6.0 or above.

=== Avatars ===
The avatars in VenueGen were created using a licensed technology developed at the University of Southern California that converted a photo into a 3D model. The photo-generated 3D avatar face featured a set of morph targets that conveyed facial expressions. Facial expressions could be controlled by the user through preset buttons in-world.

Prior to entering a meeting, users could upload images of their own faces to create their photo-realistic avatars and choose from a built-in selection of hairstyles, clothing and accessories to resemble themselves.

During a virtual meeting, avatars made conversational gestures that were automatically driven by a user's own voice. Users also had the option to control the mood, body posture, and nonverbal language of their avatars to communicate as they would in a real meeting.

=== Venues ===
VenueGen had 36 different virtual meeting spaces including a board room, executive office, lecture hall, theater, sailboat, campfire, coffee shop, amphitheater and talk show studio where users could conduct their online meetings. The largest virtual room could accommodate up to 50 guests, the smallest 2 guests.

=== Audio ===
Users with a headset and a broadband connection could communicate through VoIP or dial-in from a phone line using one of VenueGen's designated conference phone numbers. Voices of participants were heard in-world through 3D positional sound audio that enabled users to locate and identify users speaking around the room.

=== Integrated Content ===
Screen sharing and content sharing supported integration of word processing, spreadsheet, presentation and digital media files. Documents used during the meeting were displayed on a viewer within the virtual rooms. The viewer(s) could be viewable by anyone in the meeting, or just one person depending on the venue and viewer chosen. Each viewer could display several forms of content simultaneously, including documents, or streamed feeds such as a webcam or Desktop sharing session.
