= Limnu =

Online whiteboarding app

- Stable release: 6 March 2018; 8 years ago
- Type: Virtual whiteboard
- License: Freemium
- Website: limnu.com

Limnu is an online whiteboarding app founded in 2015 by David DeBry and David Hart. In 2018, it was acquired by Andrew Kunz. It allows users to draw on virtual whiteboards and invite others by e-mail or by sharing a link. Invitees see any changes to the board in real time and, if allowed by the owner of the board, can also draw on the board. The service is accessible through a web application in desktop and mobile web browsers, as well as through an iOS application. It is headquartered in San Mateo, California.

== History ==
In 2018, ZipSocket, a maker of online meeting software acquired Limnu.

== Staff Directory ==
- Andrew Kunz - CEO & Founder of ZipSocket
- Jenny Rice - Product Manager
