= Boland T. Jones =

American entrepreneur and executive (born 1960)

- Born: February 17, 1960 (age 66); Louisville, Kentucky, US
- Education: Miami University
- Occupations: Founder, Former Chairman & Former CEO, PGi
- Spouse: Andrea Jones (1990 – present)

Boland Timothy Jones (born February 17, 1960) is an American entrepreneur and executive. He is best known as the founder of PGi, a publicly traded telecommunications provider headquartered in Atlanta, Georgia.

== Early life and education ==
Boland Jones was born and raised in the city of Louisville, Kentucky and attended St. Xavier High School (class of 1978). Born into a family of nine, Boland is the middle child to four sisters and two brothers. From an early age, Boland began working at his father's dry cleaning business working the counter or cleaning the machines. By age 14, he began cutting grass and at 16, learned how to resurface pavement and started repaving people's driveways. He attended college at Miami University of Ohio on a tennis scholarship where he earned a degree in finance and accounting in 1982.

== Professional career ==
In 1984, Jones started his first company, American Network Exchange (AMNEX). AMNEX sold calling cards, which Jones developed, to help military personnel connect with their loved ones. The cards allowed users to bill pay phone calls to their home phones or credit cards. Jones sold AMNEX in 1990.

In 1991, Jones moved to Atlanta and founded a new company, Premiere Technologies, Inc., which enabled users to retrieve voice messages, make conference calls and send and receive faxes. This business would eventually become Premiere Global Services, Inc., now known as PGi. Jones successfully took the company public on NASDAQ in 1996 and on the NYSE as well shortly thereafter.

Currently, Jones remains active as PGi's Founder, chairman and CEO and has grown PGi into a prominent virtual meetings company, where he led development of PGi's latest two virtual meeting solutions, iMeet and GlobalMeet. Beyond his work at PGi, Boland has helped fund and launch more than 100 companies.

Following PGi's acquisition by Siris Capital Group in 2015, Jones stepped down as CEO of PGi.

== Philanthropy ==
In 1998, Boland founded the Boland T. Jones Family Foundation with his wife Andrea. The Foundation concentrates its fundraising efforts to support cancer research, primarily breast cancer, and to aid disadvantaged children.

Boland is also committed to encouraging startups and entrepreneurship. In 2001, Boland helped fund the Entrepreneurship Research Lab at his alma mater Miami University of Ohio's Farmer School of Business.

Boland also leads PGi's Corporate Social Responsibility Program, sponsoring and supporting many local and global nonprofits worldwide.

== Personal life ==
Boland married Andrea Baker, a childhood friend, in 1990. Boland, along with his wife Andrea and their three children, currently reside in Atlanta.
