= Real-time collaboration =

Real-time collaboration may refer to the use of various different types of software for collaboration between people in real-time, such as:

- Instant messaging and chat rooms
- Videoconferencing
- Real-time collaborative editing of documents
- Desktop sharing
