= I'm InTouch =

- Screenshot from I'm InTouch remote control session.
- Developer: 01 Communique
- Stable release: 9.51 / December 2015; 10 years ago
- Operating system: Microsoft Windows
- Available in: English, French, Spanish, Portuguese, German, Chinese Traditional, Chinese Simplified
- Type: Remote access
- License: Proprietary
- Website: www.imintouch.com

I'm InTouch is a remote control software program that allows users to access and control a computer with the software installed from another computer or wireless device over the Internet. I'm InTouch is developed and marketed by 01 Communique.

== History ==
I'm InTouch was released to 01 Communique's corporate partners in 2000 and entered full distribution in 2001. Early versions of I'm InTouch allowed users to set up a communications server on their home or office computer to access voicemail, emails, pages, and faxes from a web browser, phone, or wireless device.

01 Communique would eventually incorporate their technology for providing access to a personal computer from another remote computer that they received a patent for in 2005 into I'm InTouch. The company would launch a patent infringement lawsuit against Citrix Systems claiming the company's competing remote access software GoToMyPC infringed on their patent.

== Technology ==
I'm InTouch consists of the two parts, the gateway server and client software installed on the user's computer. The server, located on 01 Communique's premise, brokers the remote access session and communicates with the user's computer. All data communication takes place over ports 80 (HTTP) and 443 (HTTP over TLS/SSL). End-to-end communications are encrypted with 128-bit SSL.

== Version updates ==
In 2005, version 4.0 expanded on previous versions Virtual Network Computing (VNC) remote client remote feature by including full remote control options. Version 5.0 was released with remote control from Pocket PC devices added along with remote printing. Version 6.0 would be released in 2007 with the main addition being a remote chat feature.

In 2008, 01 Communique released an upgraded version of the software called I'm InTouch Premium. New to the program was a feature allowing users to remotely power on their shut down computers for access using Wake-On-LAN technology.

== Corporate Server Edition ==
In 2005, 01 Communique released I'm InTouch Corporate Server Edition (CSE), an enterprise level software package co-developed with Hitachi. The package included software to install on a company's server, bypassing the need to use 01 Communique's servers for remote access sessions. Version 2.0 was released in 2006 adding a remote "wake-up" feature allowing users to turn on a shut down computer from a web browser.

In Japan, Hitachi markets I'm InTouch CSE as DoMobile CSE and combines it with their Flora Se210 notebook. The package is marketed towards companies concerned with data leakage from laptops.
