= Raindance =

Raindance may refer to:

- Rain dance, a Native American ritual dance to invoke rain
- Raindance Communications, a US company that provides online meeting, web conferencing and teleconferencing services
- Raindance Film Festival and film school
- Raindance (Clark Datchler album), 1990
- Raindance, a 1975 album by Gryphon
- Raindance, a 1984 album by David Lasley
- Raindance (Sara Storer album), 2019
- "Raindance" (song), a 2025 song by Dave and Tems
- Raindance, a song by Jon Batiste from the album World Music Radio
- Raindance (rave music promoter), British rave event organisers
- Raindance Foundation, an early video art group and public access cable pioneer
- RainDance Technologies, an American company founded by Jonathan Rothberg
- Operation Raindance, a military offensive during the Laotian Civil War

== See also ==
- Raindancing, a 1987 album by Alison Moyet
