= Subrah Iyar =

Indian businessman (born 1957)

Subrah S. Iyar
- Born: June 11, 1957 (age 69); Bombay, Maharashtra State, India
- Education: IIT Bombay, B.S. University of Southwestern Louisiana, M.S.
- Occupation: Founder of Moxtra
- Known for: Founder of Cisco WebEx
- Children: 2

Subrah S. Iyar (born June 11, 1957) is an entrepreneur. He co-founded and was CEO of web conferencing provider WebEx until its acquisition by Cisco Systems in 2007 for US $3.2 billion. He is an early investor in and an advisor to Zoom Communications.

== Early life ==
Subrah S. Iyar was born in Mumbai, and received a B.S. in electrical engineering from the Indian Institute of Technology Bombay (IIT-B). After graduation in 1982, he moved to the United States.

== Career ==
Beginning in 1983, he worked for 6 years for Apple Inc., where he was instrumental in creating the first OS licensing business in the Newton Group.

From 1989 to 1995, he worked at Intel, where he directed product marketing and OEM sales management within the LAN software and systems group.

From October 1995 until November 1996, he was president of Future Labs, a subsidiary of Quarterdeck Office Systems.

He was vice president of sales, marketing, and business development at Teleos Research, which was acquired by Autodesk.

Iyar became an entrepreneur in 1996, when he founded WebEx in partnership with Min Zhu. The founding of the company was fueled by an interest in web conferencing. Min Zhu, a Stanford University-trained System Engineer had been struggling to develop a web-conferencing tool, when he met Iyer, who went into business together.

On May 29, 2007, Cisco Systems acquired WebEx for $3.2 billion.

After a 6-year break spending time with his 2 daughters, in 2012, Iyar co-founded and became CEO of Moxtra. Moxtra is a digital client interaction platform that received funding from Cisco and KDDI from Japan.
