= Paglo =

American technology company

Paglo was an information technology management software as a service company that provided a search engine for IT and logs. It was designed for IT professionals and Managed Service Providers (MSPs), and it allowed them to discover all of their IT data and solve computer, network, and user problems. The company was launched on November 19, 2007. It was bought by Citrix Online.

Paglo consisted of three key components: Paglo Crawler, Paglo Search Index, and Paglo UI. Users downloaded the open source Paglo Crawler to run on their network on any desktop computer or server. It crawled their network and IT assets and gathered information, which it then securely uploaded to each user’s private Paglo Search Index. Windows event logs were also collected via the Crawler and Unix logs were sent directly into the Paglo Search Index via Syslog-ng or Rsyslog.

Via a browser and the Paglo UI, users accessed their account to query their Paglo Search Index, to display the results as charts, lists, or tables. Users could save queries onto a Dashboard that continuously self-updated as the Crawler uploaded fresh data. Users could also save their queries and Dashboard views for the community to use. The company termed this communal aspect of Paglo, "Social Solving"

Paglo was headquartered in Menlo Park, California. The name Paglo is in honor of the fictitious, 17th-century Italian explorer Francisco Paglo].

== History ==
Paglo was founded in July 2007, after Brian de Haaff and Chris Waters led the sale of Network Chemistry's wireless security business to Aruba Networks. Paglo also includes two network troubleshooting and management tools developed by Paglo's founders, Packetyzer and RogueScanner.

The company entered a private beta period in late January 2008. On May 27, 2008 the public beta of service was opened. In January 2009, the company released the service. On June 30, 2009 the company released the first cloud-based log search engine. Users could use Syslog-ng or Rsyslog to send log data directly to Paglo.

In 2010, Paglo was acquired by Citrix Online. Its technology was integrated into the GoToAssist line of products.
