= BigMarker =

- Developer(s): BigMarker, LLC
- Type: Web conferencing Video conferencing
- License: Proprietary
- Website: bigmarker.com

BigMarker is a browser based, digital events platform. The platform supports various event types, including virtual and in-person events, web conferences and webinars as well as event-adjacent tools, such as mobile event apps and community platforms. BigMarker allows users to record, store and download webinars and web conferences.

== History ==
BigMarker was developed in 2010 by Zhu-Song Mei, formerly of Accenture in Chicago, Illinois. Since then, BigMarker has become a webinar and event technology platform.

== Technology ==
The original BigMarker platform operated on Adobe Flash Player. BigMarker currently operates on WebRTC technology and has been a browser-based solution. BigMarker is designed to connect people and groups on the internet via a person's computer, webcam, microphone, and speakers.

== Features ==
BigMarker supports up to 10,000 concurrent webcams and up to 500,000 live attendees, The platform includes features such as live polls, Q&A, and surveys. Additionally, BigMarker supports automation, allowing hosts to pre-record sessions and schedule them for specific times.
