= Northern Light Venture Capital =

China-based venture capital firm

Northern Light Venture Capital Development Limited
- Native name: 北极光创投
- Company type: Private
- Industry: Venture Capital
- Founded: 2005; 21 years ago
- Founders: Feng Deng; Jeffrey Lee; Yan Ke
- Headquarters: 2855 Sand Hill Road, Menlo Park, California, U.S.
- Products: Investments
- AUM: US$4.5 billion (2020)
- Website: nlvc.com

Northern Light Venture Capital (NLVC) (Chinese: 北极光创投; pinyin: Běijíguāng Chuàngtóu) is a Chinese venture capital firm founded in 2005. It focuses on investing in companies in the technology and healthcare sectors.

== Background ==
NLVC was founded in 2005 by Feng Deng, Jeffrey Lee and Yan Ke. Feng Deng and Yan Ke were previously co-founders of NetScreen Technologies, an IT Security company that went public on Nasdaq in 2001 and was later acquired by Juniper Networks in 2004 for $4.2 billion. New Enterprise Associates and Min Zhu (co-founder of WebEx) were initial backers of the firm when it was raising its first fund. Greylock Partners is another early backer of the firm.

NLVC invests 70% of its funds into Series A rounds, 20% in Series B rounds and 10% into Seed rounds. Notable investments include Aerohive Networks, Meituan and VIPKid.

NLVC has offices in Silicon Valley, Hong Kong and several cities in China including Beijing and Shanghai.

== Funds ==
Fund	Vintage Year	Committed Capital ($m)
Northern Light Venture Fund I	2005	USD 120
Northern Light Venture Fund II	2007	USD 350
Northern Light Venture Fund III	2011	USD 400
Northern Light Venture Fund IV	2015	USD 400
Northern Light Venture Fund V	2019	USD 450
Northern Light Venture Fund VI	2020	USD 375
