= Tommy Ahlers =

Danish parliament member (born 1975)

Member of the Folketing
- In office 5 June 2019 – 12 August 2021
- Constituency: Copenhagen

Minister of Higher Education and Science
- In office 2 May 2018 – 27 June 2019
- Prime Minister: Lars Løkke Rasmussen
- Preceded by: Søren Pind
- Succeeded by: Ane Halsboe-Jørgensen

Personal details
- Born: 18 November 1975 (age 50) Haderslev, Denmark
- Party: Venstre
- Other political affiliations: Conservative People's Party
- Children: 2
- Education: MSc, Law, University of Copenhagen

Tommy Ahlers (born 18 November 1975) is a Danish entrepreneur, investor and former politician who was a member of the Folketing for Venstre from 2019 to 2021. He served as Minister of Higher Education and Science in the Lars Løkke Rasmussen III Cabinet from 2018 to 2019.

Before entering politics, Ahlers worked in the technology sector and was chief executive of the mobile company ZYB, which was sold to Vodafone in 2008, and later of Podio, which was acquired by Citrix in 2012. He also became known in Denmark as an investor and television personality through the Danish version of Dragons' Den ("Løvens hule").

After leaving politics in 2021, Ahlers returned to business and took on roles in venture capital, academia and public and non-profit governance. He became a founding partner at Look Up Ventures in 2022, was appointed adjunct professor at the Technical University of Denmark (DTU) in 2023, became chairman of CONCITO in 2024, and later also chairman of the board of Metroselskabet.

== Early life and education ==
Ahlers was born on 18 November 1975 in Haderslev and grew up in Agerskov in southern Jutland in an Inner Mission family. His parents were active in the local religious community, and he later recalled that church attendance, Sunday school and family prayer formed part of his upbringing.

Until the age of six, Ahlers lived with his family on a farm. As a boy, he worked first at a local timber merchant and later on nearby farms, where he helped care for cattle and carried out other agricultural work. He attended a Christian continuation school and later studied at business college.

In his youth, Ahlers became active in Young Conservatives in Aabenraa, where he chaired the local branch and later served on the organisation's national executive committee. He was also an unsuccessful candidate for the Conservative People's Party at the 1998 Danish general election.

Ahlers later moved to Copenhagen and studied law at the University of Copenhagen, graduating in 2000.

== Business career ==
After graduating, Ahlers worked as a consultant and project manager at McKinsey & Company from 2001 to 2004.

In 2004, he became founder and chief executive of ZYB, a mobile services company later sold to Vodafone in 2008. He subsequently worked at Vodafone and Wayfinder Systems before becoming chief executive of Podio in 2010. Podio was acquired by Citrix for $43.6 million in April 2012.

From 2015, Ahlers worked as an investor and held a number of board positions. He also appeared in the Danish version of Dragons' Den.

After leaving politics, he returned to business. In 2022, he became a founding partner at Look Up Ventures, an investment firm focused on climate and deep-tech ventures.

== Political career ==
Ahlers entered politics for Venstre and became a member of the Folketing in 2019. On 2 May 2018, he was appointed Minister of Higher Education and Science and Science in the Lars Løkke Rasmussen III Cabinet. He remained in office until 27 June 2019, when the government left office after the 2019 Danish general election.

On 3 August 2021, Ahlers announced that he was leaving politics and returning to business. He said that he wanted to work on the green transition as an entrepreneur and that he found political life at Christiansborg too focused on political games and too little on ideas.

== Later career ==
In 2023, Ahlers was appointed adjunct professor at the Technical University of Denmark and attached to DTU Entrepreneurship. In April 2024, he became chairman of CONCITO. On 1 May 2025, he became chairman of the board of Metroselskabet.

== Personal life ==
Ahlers has two children from his first marriage, which ended in 2012. In 2018, he said publicly that he is bisexual. From 2019 to 2022, he was in a relationship with media entrepreneur and broadcaster Le Gammeltoft.

Political offices
Preceded by Søren Pind	Minister of Higher Education and Science; 2016–2018	Succeeded by Ane Halsboe-Jørgensen
