= Shahin (Shawn) Shadfar =

Persian-American entrepreneur (born 1973)

- Born: 1973; Tehran, Iran
- Died: November 19, 2018; California, United States
- Education: Supelec, Georgia Tech
- Occupations: Founder and President, omNovia Technologies; Co-Founder and CEO of Zurf

Shahin (Shawn) Shadfar (Persian: شاهین‌ شادفر; born 1973 in Tehran - died in 2018 in California) was a Persian-American entrepreneur. He was the founder and president of omNovia Technologies, a software company specialized in web and video conferencing technology, and Xerzees Technologies, the company behind the mobile app Zurf.

== Early childhood and education ==
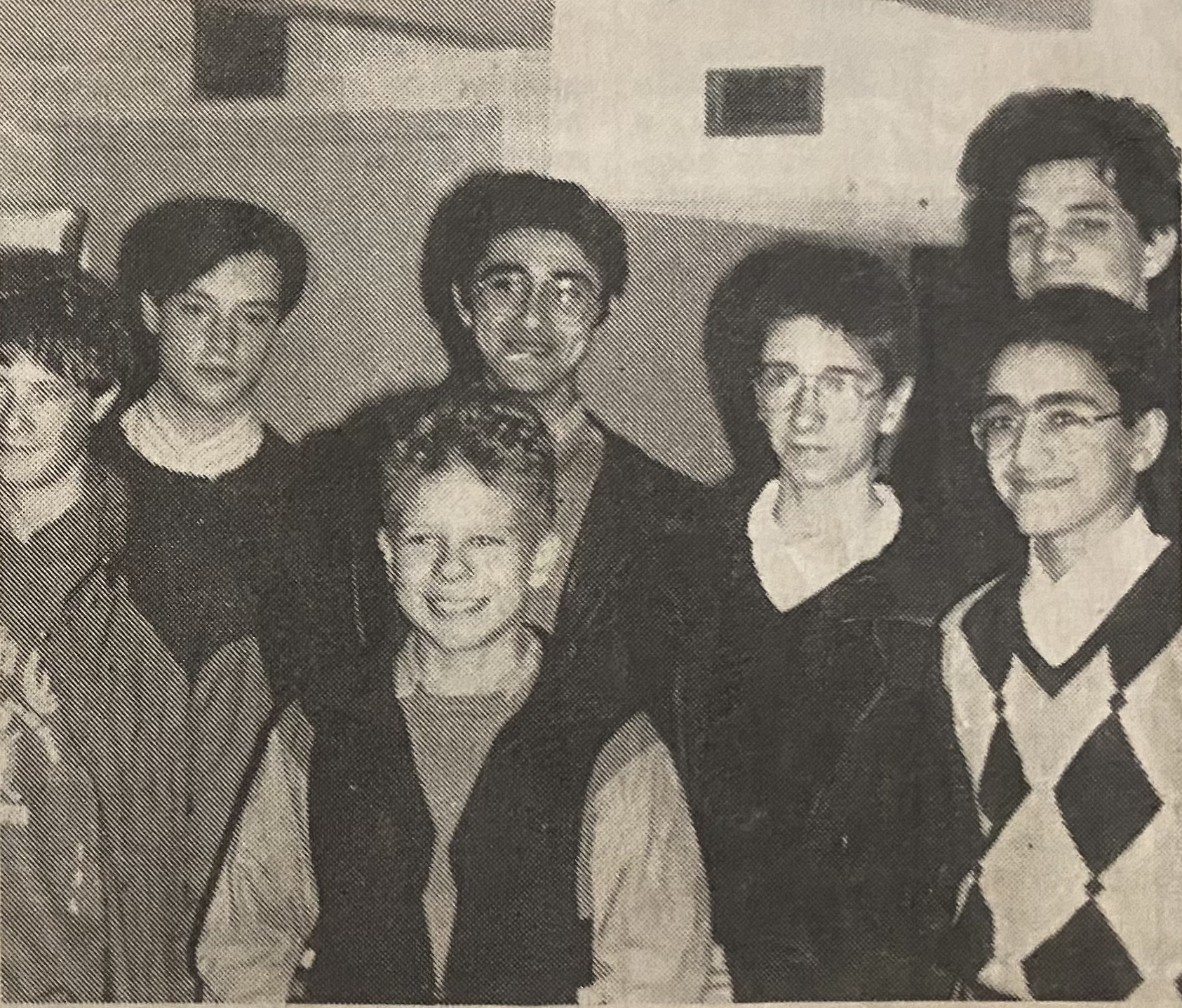
Shahin, aged 16, as winner of a programming contest in Caen, France

Shahin Shadfar left Iran at age 12 and lived in France until the age of 24. He attended the Lycee Joffre Engineering Prep School and acquired his Bachelor of Science and master's degree in computer science from Supelec, Paris. Shahin moved to the United States at age 24 and received a Master of Science in electrical engineering from Georgia Tech in Atlanta.

During his teenage years, Shahin was a software programmer who learned BASIC, Pascal, C, and Prolog.

== Schlumberger ==
After graduation Shahin Shadfar joined the R&D department for Smart Cards in 1998 at Schlumberger in Austin and was part of the team that created and marketed the first Smart Card with on-board cryptography and java also known as Java Card. He later focused in the Information Security group at Schlumberger leveraging smart cards for Identity Management.

== omNovia ==
In May 2004, Shahin Shadfar left Schlumberger and founded omNovia Technologies as an information security consulting firm but rapidly switched to developing a new web and video conferencing technology.

== Zurf ==
Shahin and his wife, Muna started Zurf in July 2013. Zurf is a mobile app enabling one to leave "sticky notes" or zNotes for friends on top of any item (picture) on any website. Friends are automatically taken to the webpage and shown the item along with the zNote and can then add comments right on the note. Zurf was launched at the TechCrunch Disrupt show in San Francisco in September 2014. Shahin moved his family to San Francisco in May 2014. TechCrunch published an article on Zurf on September 12, 2014.

== Death ==
Shahin Shadfar died on November 19, 2018, at the age of 45 due to colon cancer. The news of his death was never announced publicly; however, it was revealed by a compatriot in 2019.
