= OmNovia Technologies =

omNovia Technologies
- Type: Private Company
- Industry: Software
- Founded: 2004
- Headquarters: Houston, Texas (United States)
- Products: Web conferencing, webinar and webcasting
- Website: www.omNovia.com

omNovia Technologies is a software company, founded by Shahin (Shawn) Shadfar in 2004 that provides web conferencing platform for realtime, rich-media online meetings, webinars, webcasts and eLearning sessions with two to 5,000 interactive participants. The company's headquarters is located in Houston, Texas. According to the company, the name omNovia derives from "omni" and "innovation".

== Products ==
omNovia Technologies provides interactive web conferencing and webinar platform for online collaborative meetings, online trainings, remote learning sessions and live webcasting. The web based platform hosts online meetings with up to 5,000 participants in a virtual meeting room. The interactive features of the platform include integrated full 1080p High Definition video and audio, white board, desktop sharing, polling, movie and YouTube player, Q&A Manager, Cobrowser, world map and Twitter integration. The company also provides webcasting and remote support technologies. The company's web conferencing platform also offers the ability of multilingual web conferencing platform, allowing companies to host web conferences in a variety of languages simultaneously.

On April 7, 2009, omNovia was selected as the official webcast technology for the 2009 Digital Energy Conference organized by the Society of Petroleum Engineers.

In November 2011, omNovia was selected by the US State Department for its internal webinars.

About.com recognized omNovia as a "Great Alternative to Citrix GotoMeeting.

== Awards ==
In 2008, omNovia Technologies won the 19th place in FastTech 50 awards program. In 2009 the company was nominated to the same award program.
