= Raindance Communications =

- Type: Subsidiary, private company
- Industry: Telecommunications software and services
- Founded: April 1997
- Headquarters: Louisville, Colorado
- Key people: Don Detampel (President and Chief Executive Officer); Todd Vernon (Co-founder and Chief Technology Officer); Nicholas J. Cuccaro (Chief Financial Officer)
- Products: Raindance Seminar Edition; Raindance Meeting Edition; Raindance Web Conferencing Pro; Raindance Reservationless Conferencing
- Website: http://www.raindance.com

Raindance Communications, Inc. was an American company that provided online meeting, web conferencing and teleconferencing services. The company offered interactive services including automated phone conferencing, web conferencing, and collaboration, which allows users the ability to whiteboard, tour the web, and share desktop applications.

== History ==
Raindance was founded in April 1997 in Delaware. Their principal executive offices were located in Louisville, Colorado. The company had its first recorded revenues in January 1998 and had incurred net losses since inception. Raindance began offering its web and phone conferencing service in April 1999 and the Web Conferencing Pro service upon our acquisition of Contigo Software, Inc. in June 2000.

In May 2001, the company changed its name from Evoke to Raindance Communications as a result of a settlement agreement reached in January between Evoke Software, "Raindance is an inviting symbol of how we harness the collective energy of a group of people. We allow workgroups to spontaneously come together over the phone and web to share ideas and make things happen." That same year, Raindance was restructured to solely focus on web and phone conferencing services. In connection with this restructuring, significant changes were made to the services and growth strategies, including a significant reduction in the employee base. As a result of the limited operating history, increased competition and the rapidly changing market for the web conferencing services the company's quarterly operating results have varied significantly from period to period. For example, its quarterly net loss ranged between $1.8 million and $12.9 million in the four quarters ended March 31, 2002. The company's quarterly revenue ranged between $9.1 million and $13.9 million in the four quarters ended March 31, 2002.

In February 2006, Raindance was acquired by Omaha, Nebraska-based West Corporation, a provider of outsourced communication solutions for $110 million, at $2.70 per share in cash. Shareholders of Raindance agreed to the acquisition in April 2006 and the company was then incorporated into InterCall, Inc., a division of West Corporation.

== Products ==
Raindance Communications offered the "Web Conferencing Pro" service, which was originally called "Collaboration". It is a web conferencing tool that allows users to hold virtual meetings and seminars. Meeting moderators can share desktop applications, display slides, conceptualize on a shared whiteboard and lead a web tour. In addition, moderators can use a variety of tools to keep participants engaged and encourage interactivity, including annotation tools, text chat, and polling. Its interface could have been branded with personalized colors and logo. The product was offered in two versions, Meeting and Seminar. The Web Conferencing Pro Meeting featured:

- User sharing share desktop applications in real-time;
- Whiteboarding, which allowed moderators to write or draw in real-time;
- Web Touring, allowed moderators to guide participants anywhere on the web;
- Text Chat, a real-time web chat;
- Polling, it enabled moderators to plan or conduct live polling during a presentation;
- Co-moderator capabilities enabled a moderator to promote any number of participants to take control of the conference and
- Record and Playback which allowed users to record their conference meeting

The Web Conferencing Pro Seminar built upon the features of the Meeting version with the addition of automated event management tools such as posting meeting schedules, managing participant registration and setting automatic email reminders before the event. In addition, the Seminar version includes additional features to encourage large-group interaction and management, such as the Q&A feature.

== Raindance lawsuit for patent infringement ==
On September 27, 2005, WebEx sued Raindance Communications, Inc., for patent infringement. On October 14, 2005, Raindance filed a countersuit against WebEx for patent infringement. Both parties sought both damages and an injunction enjoining further acts they claim to be infringing on patents. On March 31, 2006, the parties agreed to the dismissal of both actions, releases of claims for past infringement, payments associated with those releases, and cross-licenses to each other's patents. The agreement resulted in WebEx receiving $1.0 million from Raindance.

== Awards ==
Raindance Communications won the 20th Annual TeleCon Awards for 1st place in Best Website and Most effective use in web conferencing. They presented at the AEA Micro Cap Financial Conference on May 15, 2002 Pacific Time. Their NASDAQ ticker symbol was: RNDC. Starting November 19, 2001 and ending (???) for a limited time, you would have got to have a limited time free trial of Web Conferencing Pro 5.0 for up to 5 users. Features of Web Conferencing Pro 5.0 included full-screen viewing with 16-bit high color, high resolution and an optional 128-bit SSL encryption to encrypt all transmissions.
