= Min Zhu (entrepreneur) =

Chinese American businessman

- 朱敏
- Born: 1948 (age 76–77); Ningbo, China
- Citizenship: United States
- Education: Zhejiang University (B.S.); Stanford University (M.S.)
- Occupation(s): Businessman; Philanthropist
- Known for: Co-founder and former president and chief technical officer of WebEx
- Board member of: University of California President's Board on Science and Innovation; Hua Yuan Science and Technology Association
- Children: Erin Zhu
- Relatives: Blixa Bargeld (son-in-law)

Min Zhu (朱敏; born 1948) is a Chinese American businessman and philanthropist. He is the co-founder and former president and chief technical officer of WebEx.

== Early life and education ==
Min Zhu was born in 1948 in Ningbo, China. In his twenties, Zhu was among a number of Chinese intellectuals compelled to work on a farm for seven years as part of a government policy intended to reeducate the country's intelligentsia with communist ideologies. At the age of 30, he studied at Zhejiang University, where he graduated with a bachelor's degree in mechanical engineering.

After the Chinese government eased restrictions on emigration, Zhu moved to the United States, where he attended Stanford University on scholarship and graduated with an M.S. in engineering economic systems.

== Career ==
Zhu developed his technology expertise at the IBM Scientific Center in Palo Alto, California. He was also the deputy to the chief technical officer of Price Waterhouse and the vice president of Expert Edge, a software design company. In 1991, Zhu co-founded Future Labs, one of the first companies to produce multi-point document collaboration software. Quarterdeck acquired Future Labs in 1996, and Zhu went on to co-found WebEx with Subrah Iyar.

On May 13, 2005, Zhu resigned from WebEx and left the United States. He continues to serve as a science and technology advisor to the municipal government of San Jose, a member of the University of California President's Board on Science and Innovation, a board director of the Hua Yuan Science and Technology Association and a partner at New Enterprise Associates.

In September 2005, NEA announced plans to back Chinese venture firm Northern Light Venture Capital.

== Personal life ==
Min Zhu is the father of Erin Zhu, CEO of OpenNote, and the father-in-law of her husband, the musician Blixa Bargeld.
