= Jesse Lipson =

American entrepreneur

- Born: 1977 (age 48–49); Iowa City
- Occupations: Corporate Vice President and General Manager, Citrix Cloud Services
- Known for: Founder of ShareFile

Jesse Lipson (born 1977) is an American entrepreneur. He founded the enterprise file sharing service ShareFile, which he sold to Citrix Systems in 2011. He was the corporate vice president and general manager of Citrix Cloud Services until 2017. He is now working on a new project, Levitate, through his holding company RealMagic.

== Early life and education ==
Lipson was born in Iowa City, Iowa in 1977. He grew up in Maryland and began a business selling card tricks to magic stores when he was 14.

He attended Duke University where he majored in philosophy. During college, he started several more ventures, including EasyCentral, a password and form manager. Following his graduation from Duke in 2000, Lipson worked for an internet start-up called FullSeven that developed branding for company e-mails during the first dot com boom. He acquired web design skills in the position, which he then parlayed into his own web development business called novelProjects. The company eventually split into three businesses.

In 2001, Lipson inherited his father's pharmaceutical market research company, Rapidata.net. Within two years he helped grow the company's revenue by 500%. The company was sold to Greenfield Online in 2005 and Lipson used the profits to help fund ShareFile.

== ShareFile ==
Lipson built and launched ShareFile in November 2005 in Raleigh, North Carolina. The idea stemmed from requests by several of his website design clients to provide a password-protected area for file exchange. Lipson aimed to update traditional FTP methods with ShareFile.

He bootstrapped ShareFile and focused immediately on procuring only business customers. By 2011, Lipson had grown the company to 4 million users with no outside capital.

In 2011, ShareFile was acquired by Citrix Systems. Lipson became vice president and general manager of Citrix Systems' newly formed data sharing product group, including ShareFile. He helped inspire and oversee the expansion of a major Citrix office in downtown Raleigh’s Warehouse District, which opened in 2014. Until 2017, Lipson was the corporate vice president and general manager of Citrix Cloud Services.

On February 21, 2017 Lipson announced he would be leaving his position as corporate vice president and general manager of the Cloud Services Business Unit at Citrix in March 2017.

== Other roles ==
Lipson is a founding partner of the Raleigh-based HQ Raleigh, a shared workspace.

He has served on the board of directors of Yext, a startup that maintains web listings for businesses, since 2012. In 2013, he started ThinkHouse, a coliving space and accelerator, for entrepreneurs.

Lipson, along with his wife, spoke at the 2016 Democratic National Convention about entrepreneurship.

== Personal life ==
Lipson lives in Raleigh, NC and is married to entrepreneur Brooks Bell.
