= AnyMeeting =

AnyMeeting, Inc. (Formerly Freebinar) is a provider of web conferencing and webinar services for small business that enables users to host and attend web based conferences and meetings and share their desktop screen with other remote users via the web. AnyMeeting is a web-based software application accessible by users via a web browser. This method of software delivery is commonly referred to as Software as a Service (or SaaS). The company was founded in 2011 and backed by Keiretsu Forum angel investors.

== Features ==
Features include 6-way video conferencing, screen sharing, applicationsharing, recording, public profiles, surveys, polls, audio via conference call or computer mic and speakers, YouTube video sharing and an additional option that enables meeting hosts to charge attendees (via PayPal) to access a webinar.

AnyMeeting provides two primary options for users to access the features and functionality of its service: a free option that is ad-supported software and a subscription-based software option that has no Ads. Advertisements are shown to meeting organizers and attendees in the sidebar of the meeting application window. The subscription option includes the same features as the Ad-supported option, except the advertisements are removed. The Ad-free plans are available for 25 and 200 attendees. AnyMeeting operates on Adobe Flash Player in all modern browsers including the latest versions of Internet Explorer, Mozilla Firefox, Google Chrome or Safari (Mac).

== History ==
The beta version of AnyMeeting was originally launched in 2009 under the name Freebinar. It was founded by Costin Tuculescu, a 12-year veteran of the web conferencing industry. In 2009, Costin identified an opportunity to try something no one else was doing, use a free, ad-supported software business model to deliver a web conferencing and webinar service. As of August 2017, AnyMeeting had over one million registered users.

AnyMeeting was acquired by Intermedia in September 2017.

== Security ==
AnyMeeting online meetings can be protected with an encrypted password feature for those who want to restrict access to their meeting or charge a fee to attend. Meeting recordings can also be password protected.

== Accolades ==
AnyMeeting was named by CIO.com in its list of the best free stuff of 2012

AnyMeeting was named by PC World as one of the 15 best free business tools, apps and services of 2012

AnyMeeting named in Small Business Computing as one of 3 software products small businesses need to know

AnyMeeting was named by PCMag.com as one of the best free web apps of 2011.

== Integrations ==
- Google Apps Marketplace
- VMware's Zimbra
