= InSoft Inc. =

Insoft, Inc.
- Industry: Computer software
- Founded: 1992
- Defunct: 1996
- Fate: Merged to Netscape Communications in 1996
- Headquarters: Mechanicsburg, Pennsylvania; United States
- Key people: Daniel Harple; Richard Pizzarro
- Products: Communique; InSoft Network Television; CoolTalk; CoolView; ICEMaker; InSoft ICS; ICE suite
- Number of employees: 70+ (1995)

InSoft Inc. was an American developer of network-based communications software and multimedia software founded in 1992 in Mechanicsburg, Pennsylvania. The company’s applications included Communique, which is used for desktop collaboration and videoconferencing.

InSoft has been called a pioneer in the desktop videoconferencing market, and is credited with developing the first generation of Internet media streaming and VoIP/collaborative software applications that would later be developed into NetscapeConference and NetscapeMedia Server. These, in turn, would provide the groundwork for the Real Time Streaming Protocol (RTSP) standard. RTSP is used to control incoming data when streaming video. The company was sold to Netscape Communications on April 25, 1996.

== History ==
Company founders Daniel Harple and Richard Pizzarro met in 1990 while employed as computer engineers at AMP Incorporated in Harrisburg, Pennsylvania. Their jobs were introducing computer-aided design systems and networked workstations to the manufacturing company. The pair wanted to create a way to let engineers working together on a design speak to and look at one another without leaving their desks over a real time video network requiring only "regular computers and cheap, desktop cameras".

Harple and Pizarro worked on their idea after hours, creating improvised labs in spare bedrooms, and connecting borrowed workstations with streams of cable. After some months, they succeeded in creating a piece of software which allowed real time, face to face collaboration over a computer network, similar to other experimental systems at the time.

The two men left AMP to co-found InSoft Inc. in 1992, with Harple acting as chairman and CEO and Pizzarro as chief engineer and vice president. Because they believed the solution to videoconferencing was in software alone, they named the new company InSoft. Money to start up the company came from family and friends, and also from the Pittsburgh-based venture capitalist Adams Capital Management, which raised funds from Philadelphia Ventures, New Enterprise Associates of Baltimore, Edison Venture Fund of Harrisburg and Newbridge Networks of Canada.

In 1992, SunWorld magazine praised InSoft's Communique product as a "killer app" for Sun, calling it "the next logical step in improving computers as communications devices". The product's could run on any high-end workstation powered by virtually any chip through most any type of existing network. Within two years, industry magazines were referring to the company as a "pioneer in the desktop videoconferencing market" The company's software was adopted by manufacturers like IBM, Hewlett Packard and others. An industry marketer wrote that InSoft had positioned itself as "a mandatory checklist item" among computer giants."

A 1994 issue of VARBusiness magazine described InSoft as pursuing "a new software model" completely independent of the compression hardware and network type that analysts predicted would dominate the future of videoconferencing. One analyst attributed InSoft's success to "its capability to deliver a product for workstations that didn't represent a huge incremental expense, and go after the PC market later." InSoft went on to sign Communique bundling deals with major technology companies such as AT&T, Sprint, Hewlett Packard, Digital Equipment, and IBM.

By 1995, the company had eight regional offices and over 70 employees. Sales of its distributed digital video solutions, desktop conferencing and videoconferencing software had topped over $7 million in annual revenue. InSoft recruited and sponsored Russian and Indian scientists for immigration to the US. Author Thomas Petzinger described the company's culture as a mixture of formal business plan and informal playfulness; photos of rock stars decorated the offices and were used as graphics for demo products, the company's music on hold featured The Grateful Dead, and mailroom employees included Harple's teenage daughter.

CEO Harple saw a potential market for InSoft's products in the early Internet, which was a low-bandwidth, copper wire-based technology at the time. Despite his board's warnings that developing Internet applications would "kill our direct sales", Harple set up an internal company skunk works team to create a low cost, mass market version of InSoft's software that would run over the lower bit-rate Internet. This involved the invention of lower bit rate compression algorithms for audio and video signals and synchronization. When the resulting new Internet product was nearing completion, word of "a possible picture phone for the Internet" reached Netscape founder James H. Clark, and he traveled to InSoft headquarters for a demonstration. He was so impressed that he promptly proposed a merger with Netscape.

The company is credited with developing the first generation of commercial, US-based VoIP (Voice Over Internet Protocol, Internet media streaming and realtime Internet telephony/collaborative software and standards that would later become NetscapeConference and NetscapeMedia Server. These, in turn, would provide the basis for the Real Time Streaming Protocol (RTSP) standard.

== Online customer network ==
InSoft was noted for taking the lead in establishing online communities for customers. It created a web-based forum during its firsl year of operation with the intention of using it as a source of new ideas that would lead to new product development. The company asked its customers to tell them what new product features were needed, leading to speedy development of new product versions. Although the final products were sold primarily through stores, the company let potential customers download test versions for review and comment. InSoft assigned a manager specifically to categorize and channel customer ideas and suggestions product development team, and then post the responses of the team to the customer community web site. Letting InSoft customers actively contribute to the development of new product versions also helped increase the firm's visibility among potential customers in high technology markets.

== Sale to Netscape ==
InSoft was bought by Netscape in 1996, for a value of $161 million. Technology acquired by Netscape from Insoft included Communique for desktop collaboration and videoconferencing, InSoft Network Television for distributed digital video, and CoolTalk and CoolView for Internet audio, video and data communications on Windows, Windows95 and UNIX based platforms. Netscape integrated InSoft's products in two phases. In the first phase, the combined companies developed LiveMedia framework and continued to promote InSoft's OpenDVE software architecture and development toolkits and applications including its GlobalConference telecommunications gateway. In the second phase, Netscape integrated InSoft's real-time audio and video capabilities into Netscape Navigator and Netscape servers, with third-party developers contributing add-on audio and video products based on the LiveMedia framework.

== Products ==
=== Communique ===
Launched in 1992, Communique was a software-based Unix teleconferencing product for workstations that enabled video/audio/data conferencing. Communique supported as many as 10 users, and included revolutionary features such as application sharing, audio controls, text, graphics, and whiteboarding which allowed networked users to share and manipulate graphic objects and files using simple paint tools.

Communique was able to operate across Ethernet and between a variety of data communications services such as ATM, frame-relay, ISDN and SMDS, as well as any standard network that ran TCP/IP. This was because it used InSoft's Digital Video Everywhere (Open DVE), a proprietary algorithm that featured an API for running multimedia conferencing software across many kinds of networks, not independent of the hardware they used. Running as an independent software layer on top of the specific host operating system, DVE architecture let users and vendors customize their InSoft-equipped networks by building applications that worked through Communique. Communique also used InSynch, InSoft's audio/video synchronization algorithm that optimized conference quality when users scaled bandwidth up or down.

The 1994 release of Communique featured a "Virtual Conference Room" where users could start a conference or join one in progress by using a point-and-click interface. Participants were shown up as icons in the "room", meetings could be saved and reviewed at a later date. Conference attendees could make use of real-time digital video and audio, and also shared and edited graphics and image files, ASCII files and video frames. A module called SHARE (SHared Application Resource Environment) allowed conference attendees to "share" and manipulate an application as though it were running locally, with the results displayed on all screens. A shared whiteboard module had features similar to an online chat session: text was posted to a common, shared notepad and displayed in the order received.

In 1995, the company released Communique for Windows and offered Communique Conference Kits that included conferencing software, and audio/video board, a video camera and a microphone.

==== InSoft Network Television ====
InSoft Network Television was a tool included with Communique that let users broadcast video signals to workstations using only software.

=== Open DVE ===
In 1995, InSoft offered Open DVE as an API toolkit to third party software vendors. The product included a suite of APIs, libraries and management tools designed to allow companies to add conferencing ability to their own software.

=== InSoft Interactive Collaborative Environment (ICE) ===
In early 1996, InSoft launched a series of products designed to bring collaborative computing over dial-up lines to the Internet.

==== CoolTalk ====
CoolTalk was a multimedia software tool that let PC users view data displayed on a shared whiteboard, exchange real-time messages via a chat tool or speak with each other via a TCP/IP voice connection. The product worked with Microsoft Sound System-compatible audio boards and was available in a 14.4-kbit/s version or 28.8-kbit/s version. Unveiled in 1996, CoolTalk was later packaged with popular Web browsers of the time. CoolTalk 14.4 and 28.8 sold for $49.95 and $69.95, respectively, in 1996.

==== CoolView ====
CoolView was a videoconferencing tool released in February 1996. It gave users all the features of CoolTalk plus the ability to see each other in real time, playing video at 5 frames per second. It ran on PCs equipped with a 28.8 kbit/s modem and a Video for Windows-compliant capture card. CoolView sold for $149.95 in 1996.

==== ICEMaker ====
ICEMaker was a software development kit that let users and customers build distributed multimedia applications to run over the Internet or corporate Intranet. The applications could optionally run separately or in conjunction with CoolTalk and CooView. ICEMaker sold for $795.99 in 1996.

==== InSoft Internet Communications Server ====
Designed to integrate web sites with corporate call centers, ICS featured H.320-compliant videoconferencing and allowed web sites to integrate Internet access with telephony functions - like call transfer, hold, add/drop, conference calling, and answering machine. InSoft ICS sold for just under $3,000 in 1996.
