= CoolTalk =

- Initial release: 1996
- Type: Internet telephony tool

CoolTalk was an Internet telephony tool included as a plugin in Netscape Navigator 3.0, released in 1996. It included an answering machine and a shared whiteboard. It offered full-duplex audio, multiple compression formats, including ones targeted at low-bandwidth connections, and message recording. The shared whiteboard supported text and graphics, including TIFF, GIF, JPEG, BMP, EPS, TARGA, RASTER, and SGI files. It was supported on Windows 95, Windows NT, Windows 3.1, Mac OS, SunOS, Solaris, HP-UX, Digital Unix, and IRIX.
