= Virtual Computer =

American software company

- Industry: software
- Founded: November 2007
- Founder: Alex Vasilevsky; Dan McCall
- Headquarters: Boston
- Products: NxTop® Enterprise
- Services: desktop virtualization

Virtual Computer was a venture-backed software company in the Boston area that produces desktop virtualization products, which combine centralized management with local execution on a hypervisor running on PCs. By running the workload on the PC, Virtual Computer enables companies to have centralized management without servers, storage, and networking required for server-hosted VDI.

== History ==
Virtual Computer was founded in November 2007 by Alex Vasilevsky. Highland Capital Partners and Flybridge Capital Partners invested $20 million in funding. It was acquired by Citrix in May 2012.

== Partnerships ==
In March 2011, Virtual Computer announced its collaboration with Lenovo to optimize Virtual Computer's NxTop client virtualization and management solution on Lenovo's business-oriented systems. These include select models of Lenovo's ThinkCentre A and M series desktops and ThinkPad T and X series laptops.

Virtual Computer's NxTop desktop virtualization solution is compatible with the previous three generations of Intel Core vPro processor family, including the Intel Core vPro i3, i5, and i7 processors, as well as all platforms with Intel Virtualization Technology.

== Product ==
Virtual Computer's product is the NxTop® Enterprise. It released the fourth version 4 of its client hypervisor, NxTop®4 Enterprise, in August 2011. NxTop combines a centralized management system with an enhanced Xen-based client hypervisor to create a single platform for any combination of local desktops, remote VDI sessions, and server- and cloud-based applications. NxTop provides IT control of the end-point through advanced management capabilities in NxTop Center.

Virtual Computer's core technologies include a managed client-hypervisor that runs on a bare-metal PC across a wide set of hardware platforms; a layering technology that pulls apart applications, profiles, and data so they can be managed independently; and a mechanism to tightly integrate a centralized management system with a type-1 managed hypervisor running on end-user PCs.
