= Cobrowsing =

Cobrowsing (short for collaborative browsing), in the context of web browsing, is the joint navigation through the World Wide Web by two or more people accessing the same web page at the same time.

== History of cobrowsing software ==
Early cobrowsing was achieved by local execution of software that had to be installed on the computer of each participant. More advanced tools didn't have to be installed, but still required local execution of software or at least web-browser plug-ins, extensions, or applets. Most tools were limited to a single user that was able to navigate, while the others could only watch. Newer co-browsing solutions no longer require downloads, installations, or plug-ins. Instead, these solutions rely on peer-to-peer connections and DOM manipulation.

Some tools provide very limited cobrowsing by only synchronizing the page location (URL) of the page that should be shared. Full cobrowsing supports automatic synchronization of the browsers' state and content, including frames, portlets, or even content of the form fields and controls. Some tools can even identify complex media objects such as audio and video players and offer capability of synchronous (coordinated) playback with start/pause/stop functionality.

During cobrowsing sessions, some solutions can display multiple labeled cursors and on-screen highlighting tools. Additionally, some modern cobrowsing solutions will also offer observation capabilities whereby a second person can view a live web browsing session, but not participate in its navigation.

Cobrowsing is difficult to implement due to the essential confidence requirements to share any real-time experience, and strong resistance provided by OS and browser security mechanisms. Cobrowsing technology has many inherent challenges such as page personalizations or sites that require user authentication, but many leading cobrowsing solutions are now able to overcome many of these challenges.

When used in conjunction with communication channels like live chat, video chat, or voice calls, cobrowsing has been shown to greatly improve both online sales and customer support.

== Developers of cobrowsing software ==
In 2014, Oracle Corporation purchased LiveLOOK for its cobrowsing technology. Also in 2014, Pegasystems acquired the cobrowsing tool Firefly, which was developed by a startup from Philadelphia, Pennsylvania funded by First Round Capital.

== See also ==
- Collaborative real-time editor
- Technical support
- Web conferencing
- Desktop sharing
- Remote desktop
