= XenClient =

Desktop virtualisation software

- Operating system: Linux-based (Xen)
- Type: Desktop virtualization / Hypervisor
- Website: www.citrix.com/products/xenclient/overview.html

XenClient is a discontinued desktop virtualization product developed by Citrix. It runs virtual desktops on endpoint devices. The product reached end of-life in December 2016. XenClient runs both operating system and applications locally in the end users device, without the need for a connection to a data center, which is why it is used in environments with limited connectivity (such as branch offices), disconnected operation on laptops, and other scenarios where local execution is desired while keeping management centralized.

XenClient consists of a Type-1 Xen client hypervisor and a management server, which provides the features for provisioning, de-provisioning, patching, updating, monitoring and policy controls. It enforces security through features such as AES-256 full disk encryption, VM isolation, remote kill, lockout, USB filtering, and VLAN tagging.

== History ==
XenClient was announced as "Project Independence", a joint project with Intel in January 2009. XenClient 1.0 was released by Citrix in September 2010 after working with partners such as Intel, Dell, HP, and Microsoft. In May 2012, Citrix acquired Virtual Computer, another provider of client-hosted desktop virtualization solutions. Today, Citrix has combined the NxTop solution from Virtual Computer with the Xen hypervisor in XenClient 4.5, which was released in December 2012.

== Overview ==
XenClient is available in three different editions: XenClient Enterprise, XenClient Express, and XenClient XT.

== How XenClient Enterprise works ==
XenClient Enterprise has two major components. The first is the XenClient Enterprise Engine, which includes the client hypervisor and any virtual machines managed by the hypervisor. The second is the XenClient Enterprise Synchronizer, the management server which manages multiple XenClient Enterprise Engines.

== Use ==
XenClient is used by organizations for many different purposes.

== Customers ==
Many businesses in different industries have deployed XenClient, including companies from industries such as healthcare, energy, and retail. XenClient customers include: Swisscom, Afval Energie Bedrijf (AEB), Advanced Medical Imaging, Visma ITC, Residential Finance Corporation (RFC), Eyecare Medical Group, InTown Veterinary Group, Town of Lincoln, Massachusetts

== Recognition ==
XenClient has been recognized as an industry leader in client virtualization. Citrix placed in the Leaders category of the latest “Worldwide Client Virtualization 2012 Vendor Analysis” IDC MarketScape report. In 2011, Frank Ohlhorst of SearchVirtualDesktop said that XenClient ‘offers excellent performance and improved stability’. In 2012, Andrew Wood of The Virtualization Practice called XenClient ‘a revolution in desktop virtualization for laptops’.

== Known limitations ==
Since XenClient is a Type-1 client hypervisor, it does not work with every type of operating system or hardware. For example, it does not support the Mac operating system. However, the latest version of XenClient (XenClient 5.0) has an expanded Hardware Compatibility List (HCL) with support for newer laptops or PCs, including Ultrabooks and 3rd generation Intel Core processors. In addition, XenClient has been demonstrated on the Mac OS in the past, meaning that a Mac solution is possible sometime in the future.
