= Mikogo =

- Industry: Software
- Founded: July 2007
- Headquarters: Mannheim, Germany
- Key people: Mark Zondler, Managing Director; Erik Boos, Managing Director
- Website: Official Website

Mikogo is a desktop sharing software application for web conferencing and remote support, and is provided by the online collaboration provider, Snapview GmbH. Mikogo provides its software as native downloads for Windows, Mac OS X,iOS and Android. The software is cross-platform which allows a presenter to host the online meeting on a Windows computer and meeting attendees could join from a Windows, Mac, or Linux computer, as well as from smartphones or tablets. The software interface is multi-lingual and can be switched between one of 35 languages.

== History ==
In 2004, entrepreneurs Erik Boos and Mark Zondler founded BeamYourScreen GmbH (now Snapview GmbH) in Mannheim, Germany. The company then launched a few different online collaboration tools for corporate customers. However, BeamYourScreen was approached by individuals who asked whether a free version of its software was available, for small-time use on an irregular basis and due to these requests made primarily by private users, BeamYourScreen then launched Mikogo as a free online meeting tool. Mikogo has received praise for its friendly approach to online meetings as opposed to the corporate look and feel of other web conferencing solutions.

On March 11, 2009, Mikogo announced the release of its free software for the Mac. The release of the Mac version enabled Mikogo to function as a cross platform screen sharing tool. In June 2009, Macworld UK posted a review on their website and gave Mikogo an Editor's Choice 4-Star Award, complimenting the software for its cross-platform screen sharing, features and security.

In February 2014, Mikogo Launches Version 5 with Cross-Platform VoIP for Online Meetings

Starting between 13 March and 16 August 2023 new user registrations and existing user password resets have been disabled and remain so at time of writing this update (13 November 2023).

== Controversial press ==
In April 2009, amidst the swine flu outbreak, Mikogo was criticized for promoting its software as a form of swine flu prevention. Mikogo blogged about this topic and sent out an e-mail to subscribers touting the benefits of having virtual meetings in order to avoid swine flu.
