= Desktop sharing =

Desktop sharing is a common name for technologies and products that allow remote access and remote collaboration on a person's computer desktop through a graphical terminal emulator.

The most common two scenarios for desktop sharing are:

- Remote login
- Real-time collaboration

Remote log-in allows users to connect to their own desktop while being physically away from their computer. Systems that support the X Window System, typically Unix-based ones, have this ability "built in". Windows versions starting from Windows 2000 have a built-in solution for remote access as well in the form of Remote Desktop Protocol and prior to that in the form of Microsoft’s NetMeeting.

Virtual Network Computing (VNC) is a cross-platform solution accomplished through a common client/server model. The client, or VNC viewer, is installed on a local computer and then connects to the network via a server component, which is installed on a remote computer. In a typical VNC session, all keystrokes and mouse clicks are registered as if the client were actually performing tasks on the end-user machine.

The shortcoming of the above solutions are their inability to work outside of a single NAT environment. A number of commercial products overcome this restriction by tunneling the traffic through rendezvous servers.

Apple machines require Apple Remote Desktop (ARD).

Real-time collaboration is a bigger area of desktop sharing use and has gained momentum as an important component of rich multimedia communications. Desktop sharing, when used in conjunction with other components of multimedia communications such as audio and video, offers people to meet and work together. On the larger scale, this area is also referred as web conferencing.

With a larger number of applications moving from desktop machines to cloud computing, newer forms of browser based instant screen sharing have developed such as Cobrowsing.

== Comparison of notable desktop sharing software ==
Application/tool	Screen sharing	Remote access	Instant messaging	Share control	Video conferencing	File transfer	Supported operating systems
Chrome Remote Desktop	Yes	Yes	Yes, Using Hangouts	Yes	Yes, Using Hangouts	No	ChromeOS, Linux (beta), OS X, iOS, Windows, Android
Phound	Yes	Yes	Yes	Yes	Yes	Yes	Windows, Mac, iOS, Android, Web
FreeConferenceCall.com Desktop	Yes	Yes	Yes	Yes	Yes	Yes	Windows, Mac
Discord	Yes	No	Yes	No	Yes	Yes	Windows, macOS, Android, iOS, iPadOS, Linux
GoToMyPC	Yes	Yes		Yes		Yes	Windows, Mac
HipChat	Yes	No	Yes		Yes	Yes	Windows, Mac, Linux, iPhone/iPad, Android
IBM Lotus Sametime	Yes	Yes	Yes	Yes	Yes	Yes	Windows, Linux, Mac
LogMeIn	Yes	Yes	No	No	No	Yes	Windows, Mac, iPhone, iPad, Android
Mikogo	Yes	Yes	Yes	Yes	Yes	Yes	Windows, Mac, iPhone, iPad, Android
Nefsis	Yes	Yes	Yes	Yes	Yes	Yes	Windows
Netviewer	Yes	Yes	Yes	Yes	Yes	Yes	Windows, Mac
RealVNC	Yes	Yes	Yes	Yes	No	Yes	Windows, Mac, Linux, Raspberry Pi, iOS, Android, ChromeOS, Solaris, HP-UX, AIX
Remote Utilities	Yes	Yes	Yes	Yes	Yes	Yes	Windows, Mac, Linux, iPhone, Android
Skype	Yes	Yes	Yes	No	Yes	Yes	Windows, Mac, (Linux - no sharing as client or server)
Splashtop	Yes	Yes	No	Yes	No	Yes	Windows, Mac, iPhone, iPad, Android, Linux, ChromeOS, Chrome browser, FireTV, FireTV stick
TeamViewer	Yes	Yes	Yes	Yes	Yes	Yes	Windows, Mac, Linux, iPhone, Android
Techinline	Yes	Yes	Yes	Yes	No	Yes	Windows
WebEx	Yes	Yes	Yes	Yes	Yes	Yes	Windows, Linux, Mac, Unix, Solaris, iPhone
Wire	Yes	No	Yes	No	Yes	Yes	Windows, Linux, Mac, Unix, iPhone, Android
Yuuguu	Yes	Yes	Yes	Yes			Windows, Linux, Mac
Zoom	Yes	Yes	Yes	Yes	Yes	Yes	Android, iOS, Windows, Linux, Mac

== See also ==
- Comparison of remote desktop software
- Collaborative real-time editor
- Desktop virtualization
