= ShareFile =

Collaboration software

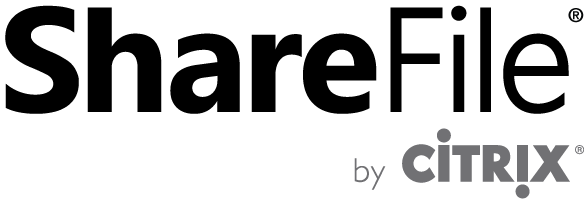
- Developer: Progress Software Corporation
- Release: November 2005; 21 years ago
- Operating system: Multiple
- Type: File sharing
- License: Proprietary
- Website: sharefile.com

ShareFile is a content collaboration, file sharing and sync software that supports all the document-centric tasks and workflow needs of small and large businesses. The company also offers cloud-based or on-premises storage, virtual data rooms and client portals. ShareFile is owned by Progress Software Corporation.

== History ==
=== Early history ===
Jesse Lipson, a self-taught programmer, built and launched ShareFile in November 2005 in Raleigh, North Carolina.

Lipson created ShareFile after several of his website design clients asked him to build a password-protected area where they could set up folders and exchange business files with their clients. He felt FTP sites of the time were insufficient and saw an opportunity to create a web-based product. ShareFile launched without a free version or outside funding, and focused on acquiring only business customers.

By 2011, ShareFile had 3 million users in 100 countries. ShareFile was included on the Inc. 500 list of Fastest Growing Private Companies in both 2010 and 2011.

=== 2011: Acquisition by Citrix Systems ===
In October 2011, ShareFile was acquired by Citrix Systems. Under terms of the agreement, ShareFile was offered as a standalone service in addition to its software becoming integrated into Citrix products. With the acquisition, Lipson became vice president and general manager of a new data sharing division within Citrix under the deal. Until 2017, Lipson served as corporate vice president and general manager of cloud services, which includes ShareFile and Citrix Workspace Cloud.

A new 171,000-square-foot Raleigh office opened in October 2014 for Raleigh-based Citrix employees. The office building was created using ShareFile and other software by Citrix and housed approximately 300 employees, until 2023. As of April 2015, ShareFile had 55,000 corporate customers and 40 million users.

=== 2023: Cloud Software Group ===
After the merger of Citrix and TIBCO Software formed Cloud Software Group, ShareFile separated its branding in 2023 to become a standalone business unit. It was included in Computerworld's 2023 list of the top ten file-sharing services.

=== 2024: Acquisition by Progress Software Corporation ===
On September 8, 2024, ShareFile has announced in its blog website that it has reached an agreement to be acquired by Progress Software Corporation. ShareFile will extend Progress’ offerings with the addition of SaaS-native document-centric collaboration, including workflow automation, client portal, secure file sync and share and integrated eSignature. At that time, they did not disclose the amount of acquisition.

On October 31, 2024, Progress Software Corporation announced that it had completed the purchase of ShareFile for $875 million. Additionally, it reported that the acquired company could provide more than 86,000 customers to the Massachusetts-based firm.

== Product overview ==
ShareFile is a secure, cloud-based platform for businesses to store and share large files. Businesses are able to create branded, password-protected areas for files through the service. ShareFile includes tools for managing client engagements, including documents workflows for client coordination. The software has a client-portal feature businesses can set up and customize to allow outside vendors and clients access to specific projects and files. Other ShareFile features include the ability to send and obtain e-signatures on documents with the integration of RightSignature; the ability to send encrypted email through a Microsoft Outlook plugin or an online portal, Microsoft 365 connection to access and edit documents stored in SharePoint Online and OneDrive for Business; and the ability for individuals to migrate data from their personal clouds into ShareFile. There are also mobile app versions of ShareFile, which allow mobile editing and offline editing of documents.

=== Security features ===
ShareFile users have the option to store data in their own data centers, Citrix-managed data centers, or use existing file storage systems via StorageZone Connectors. This allows companies to host files that they do not want stored in the cloud, in some cases due to regulatory concerns. IT managers can manage corporate content on ShareFile using remote wipe, encryption, passcode lock and poison pill features. In addition, companies are able to restrict third-party editing tools that employees might try to install on their devices, and audit content accessed from a device that has been lost or stolen.

=== Industry-specific features ===
In response to updated regulations with HIPAA standards, Citrix created ShareFile Cloud for Health Care in 2013. This private virtual cloud was designed to help companies stay compliant with updated HIPAA standards. It runs on the AWS Cloud, but sets aside specific virtual servers to host protected health information (PHI). Also in 2013, ShareFile began offering a feature called "Archiving for Financial Services" to help organizations in the financial sector comply with data archiving regulations put forth by the U.S. Securities and Exchange Commission and Financial Industry Regulatory Authority.

== See also ==
- Cloud computing
- File synchronization
- Hybrid cloud
- Virtual data room
