= Skytide =

- Company type: Private
- Founded: 2004
- Headquarters: Santa Clara, CA, USA
- Key people: Michael O'Donnell, CEO; Hamid Bahadori, CTO; Patrick Hurley, VP of Marketing; Roy Peterkofsky, VP of Product Management; Jim Goldberger, VP of Sales
- Products: Skytide for CDNs; Skytide for Video Players
- Website: www.skytide.com

Skytide is a reporting and analytics company whose software applications measure the performance of streaming video. Skytide is notable because its software is facilitating the trend by telecommunications service providers (TSPs) to operate their own content delivery networks (CDNs), in an effort to generate additional revenue from the increasing volume of video flowing over their broadband networks.
In December 2013, Skytide was acquired by Citrix Systems Inc.

== Patents ==
Skytide holds U.S. patents 7,630,956 and 8,346,811, covering its proprietary method for analyzing and reporting extensible data from multiple sources in multiple formats.

== Honors & Recognition ==
- Selected by Gartner as "Cool Vendor" in Communication Service Provider Infrastructure
- Winner of the 2009 Streaming Media Reader’s Choice Award
- Winner of the 7th Annual eWeek Excellence Awards
- Winner of 2007 Red Herring 100 award

== See also ==
- IPTV
- Over-the-top content (OTT)
- Internet television
- Connected TV
- Online video analytics
- Web log analysis software
- Web analytics
