= Net6 =

- Type: Private
- Founded: 2000; 26 years ago
- Founder: Murli Thirumale; Goutham Rao; Jon Thies; Russell Lentini
- Defunct: 2004
- Fate: Acquired by Citrix Systems
- Key people: Murli Thirumale (CEO); Goutham Rao (CTO & Chief Architect)
- Products: Application Gateway (for VoIP) access Gateway (for SSL VPNs)

Net6 was a startup founded in 2000 that created products in Security, Voice over IP VoIP protocols and SSL VPN.

== History ==
Net6 was originally called WebUnwired and was founded in 2000 by Murli Thirumale (an Ex VP and GM at Hewlett-Packard), Goutham Rao (an Operating Systems Architect at Intel), Jon Thies and Russell Lentini. Thirumale was the CEO of Net6 and Rao was the CTO and Chief Architect. The company originally focused on secure application access from mobile devices, and later shifted focus toward VoIP protocols and SSL VPN technology. The company created two hardware appliances called the Application Gateway for VoIP and the Access Gateway for SSL VPNs.

== Partnerships ==
Net6 secured OEM deals for its product lines in 2000 from Cisco Systems. In 2002 and 2003, Net6 added further OEMs for its product lines from Nortel Networks, Avaya Systems and Siemens. Net6 primarily sold its products through their partner channels.

== Funding ==
- In 2004, Net6 raised an additional $8M in series B funding from Bank of America venture partners.

== Acquisition ==
In December 2004, Net6 Inc was acquired by Citrix Systems for $50M. The acquisition marked Citrix's entry into the telecommunications security space, and Citrix continues to market the Access Gateway product under the Citrix Access Gateway product name, led by the management team of Murli Thirumale (CEO), Goutham Rao (CTO), Russell Lentini and Jon Thies (Principal Architects), Gordon Payne (VP of Marketing) and Joe Eskew (VP of Sales).
