= RightSignature =

- Type: Private
- Founded: 2009; 17 years ago
- Founder: Daryl Bernstein; Cary Dunn; Jonathan Siegel
- Headquarters: Santa Barbara, California
- Parent: Citrix Systems
- Website: rightsignature.com

RightSignature is a web and mobile e-signature service provided by Citrix Systems.

== History ==
RightSignature was privately launched in early 2009 and was first promoted at the Southern California VentureNet conference where RightSignature won first place.

Major competitors include Adobe Sign and Docusign.

In October 2014, RightSignature was acquired by Citrix Systems, where it will be added to its ShareFile service.

== See also ==
- OneSpan
- PandaDoc
- SignNow
