= 01 Communique =

Canadian cyber security and technology company

- Type: Public Listed Company (TSX-V: ONE)
- Industry: Software
- Founded: 1992
- Headquarters: Mississauga, Ontario, Canada
- Key people: Andrew Cheung, President
- Products: Remote Access Software, Online Help Desk Support Software
- Revenue: CAD 885.35k (Oct 30, 2021)
- Number of employees: 15
- Website: www.01com.com

01 Communique is a Canadian cyber security and technology company based in Mississauga, Ontario.

== History ==
01 Communique was founded in 1992. The company's first release was a fax program called 01 Fax. Its next release would be the COMMUNICATE! series, a program that combined fax, e-mail, voice mail, text recognition, and paging.

The company's focus switched to remote access software in the late 1990s. In 2000, the company filed for U.S. and Canadian patents related to the technologies they have invented and used in their commercial software. US Patent #6,928,479 and #6,938,076 were awarded in August 2005.

On March 8, 2000, 01 Communique began trading on the Toronto Stock Exchange (TSX) under the trading symbol ONE. The company had been previously trading on the Canadian Dealing Network.

In 2010, 01 Communique opened offices in Arlington, Virginia, to promote its newest product, including I'm InTouchMeeting, a video-conference software.

=== Lawsuit ===
In February 2006, 01 Communique launched a patent infringement lawsuit against Citrix Systems alleging infringement of U.S. Patent No. 6,928,479. The lawsuit was filed in the United States District Court, Northern District of Ohio, Eastern Division. The jury rejected 01 Communique's infringement claims, and in 2018 the Federal Circuit denied the company's appeal.

== See also ==
- BlockDos
