= IMeet =

iMeet
- Developer: PGi
- Operating system: Microsoft Windows; Mac OS X iOS; Android
- Type: Collaborative software Videoconferencing
- License: Proprietary
- Website: imeet.com

iMeet was a cloud-based video conferencing platform built in HTML 5 and Adobe Flash. iMeet allowed up to 125 participants to communicate using traditional landline audio or VoIP audio and to video conference through webcams. iMeet was launched in general release in January 2011. End of product lifecycle 1 April 2019.

== Features ==
iMeet was browser-based, supporting Internet Explorer 7.0 and newer, Mozilla Firefox 4 and newer, Google Chrome 11 and newer, and Safari 5 and newer. Native iMeet apps were available for the iPhone, the iPad and for Android smartphones. Many Android tablets could access iMeet through their web browser interface.

Additional features included:

- Persistent meeting room URL
- Up to 125 participants
- Traditional or VoIP audio
- HD quality webcam video through H.264 encoding
- File storage
- File sharing
- Screen sharing
- Password control on screen share and file sharing
- Support of HD audio using G.722
- Meeting minutes
- Cloud Controls, an admin console that let businesses provision and manage large numbers of accounts
- Public and private chat
- Note taking integrated with Evernote
- Customizable meeting room backgrounds
- Freely changeable profile pictures
- Integration with Facebook, Twitter, LinkedIn, YouTube and Flickr

== Global Partners ==
In March 2012, PGi announced a strategic alliance with Deutsche Telekom, positioning Deutsche Telekom as the exclusive reseller of iMeet in Germany. In July 2012, Deutsche Telekom launched its Business Marketplace with iMeet as a featured product.

In April 2012 PGi announced a strategic alliance with Irish telecommunications provider eircom to offer its video, web, and audio conferencing solutions, including iMeet and GlobalMeet, to its business customers in Ireland.

In April 2013 PGi announced a strategic alliance with TeliaSonera in the Nordic and Baltic countries. In June 2014 Telia in Sweden launched iMeet.

== See also ==
- Videoconferencing
- Collaborative software
