= FreeConferenceCall.com =

Conference call website based in California

- Website type: Teleconferencing
- Owner: David Erickson
- Website: freeconferencecall.com
- Commercial: Yes
- Launched: October 26, 2001

FreeConferenceCall.com is a website founded in 2001 in Long Beach, California. The company is one of the largest providers of conference call services online.

== History ==
The domain FreeConferenceCall.com was registered with GoDaddy on October 26, 2001, for $10 by David Erickson, founder and CEO of the Long Beach, California-based company. Erickson's original plan was only to offer freeware and then promote additional services at a cost. For the first few years since the website founding, Erickson was the only employee, performing all website coding, customer relations, and marketing functions.

Beginning in 2005, the company formally generated revenue by entering into profit-sharing agreements with local exchange carriers (LECs) in rural areas located in the Midwestern United States, such as Farmers Telephone based in Riceville, Iowa. The LECs were permitted to charge interexchange carriers such as AT&T Wireless, Verizon Communications, and Sprint to connect incoming calls to conference call numbers and would split the revenue generated from this increased traffic with FreeConferenceCall.com. With the explosion of the first free conference provider post 9/11, rural LECS were receiving hundreds of millions of minutes per month. That led to March 2007, several long-distance service providers began blocking access to these phone numbers alleging that the local exchanges were violating several laws and Federal Communications Commission (FCC) guidelines. However, by May 2007, "the blocking largely ceased after a stern prod by the Federal Communications Commission", according to the Associated Press. In June 2007, the FCC formally barred the interexchange carriers from blocking conference calls. FreeConferenceCall.com's business model was later indirectly regulated when the FCC enacted the Connect America Fund in 2012, ending the exemption for telephone companies in rural areas and requiring the LECs to operate like any other U.S. telephone company.

The FreeConferenceCall.com hold music, "Sunshine Soul" by "New York Jazz Ensemble", was licensed with Warner Chappell Production Music in 2004 and has remained the same throughout the company's history. In the late 2000s, the company tried to change the music but under intense backlash from users instead decided to offer the option to change it to a song of the customer's choice. "Sunshine Soul" has been the subject of several remixes and parodies on YouTube and SoundCloud.

FreeConferenceCall.com started "Santa's Hotline", a toll-free telephone line where children can call to leave a message for Santa Claus. The phone line was opened in 2010 but went viral on social media in 2015 after it was mentioned on Fox Business. During that year, the company said it received calls with nine million messages from children leaving their holiday gift wish lists. The phone number remains active with alternate numbers in several countries and languages.

By September 2011, FreeConferenceCall.com employed 60 people and was responsible for 20 million calls per month. That year FreeConferenceCall.com moved to a one-story building, its current 10,000-square-foot headquarters, located on Long Beach Traffic Circle.

As of 2016, the company employs more than 150 people and, in September of that year, opened satellite offices in Signal Hill, California, to accommodate its customer service staff of about 45 people.
