= Client hypervisor =

In computing, a client hypervisor is a hypervisor that is designed for use on client computers such as laptops, desktops or workstations, rather than on a server. It is a technique of host virtualization which enables the parallel execution of multiple operating systems (or virtual machines) on shared hardware. These guest systems may be used for a wide variety of tasks normally performed by dedicated physical computer systems. Client hypervisors are included in cloud computing and IaaS (Infrastructure as a Service) designs. Some well-known client hypervisors are VMware Workstation, VirtualBox and VirtualPC. Client hypervisors are categorized in two types:

- Type 1 (Bare metal): this type of client hypervisor runs directly on the host machine's hardware and serves as the host operating system, providing hardware access to guests via its own drivers. Also, it create a layer above the layer for allocate system resources to all installed virtual machines.
- Type 2 (Virtualized): this type of client hypervisor operates inside the host operating system as a stand-alone application and invokes the master operating system for access to the physical computer's resources.
