= Podio =

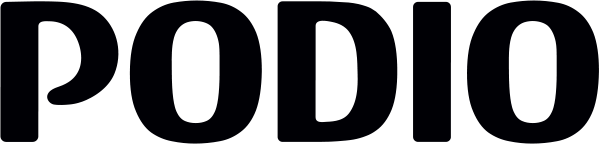
- Developer: Citrix
- Website: www.podio.com

Podio supplies a web-based platform for creating no code solutions and automated workflows. The feature set includes organizing team communication, business processes, data and content in project management workspaces according to project needs.

== History ==
Podio was founded in Denmark as Hoist by Jon Froda, Anders Pollas and Andreas Haugstrup Pedersen in early 2009. Thomas Madsen-Mygdal joined as chairman. The company signed up its first customers in August 2009 and was joined by Kasper Hulthin as co-founder.

In August 2010, Danish entrepreneur Tommy Ahlers, best known for the mobile social site ZYB, joined as CEO and angel investor.

Podio officially launched in March 2011. As part of the launch, Podio briefly opened a storefront in San Francisco where people could walk in for help with building apps.

In September, 2011, Podio launched mobile apps for iPhone and Android.

In April 2012, Citrix acquired Podio.

In June 2015, Podio added two additional plans: Podio Plus (Advanced project processes and workflows) and Podio Premium (Priority support) to offer them to its expanded customer base. The application's basic version is still free but needs to be upgraded after reaching an entry threshold.

On October 31, 2024, Progress Software Corporation announced that it had completed the purchase of ShareFile and Podio.

== Reception ==
PC Magazine has given Podio an Editor's Choice award and selected it as one of The Best Online Collaboration Software of 2016, saying "Podio is an extremely flexible and highly customizable online hub for work and communication. Because it's so user friendly and scales easily for growing businesses, it's an Editors' Choice.".

== See also ==
- Software as a service
- Collaboration software
- Project management software
- Comparison of file hosting services
- Cloud storage
- Cloud collaboration
- Enterprise social software
