= Webex =

American web conferencing and videoconferencing company

Webex by Cisco
- Type: Subsidiary
- Industry: Videoconferencing, web conferencing, Unified communications as a service
- Predecessor: WebEx Communications, Inc.
- Founded: 1995; 31 years ago
- Founder: Subrah Iyar; Min Zhu
- Headquarters: San Jose, California (United States)
- Key people: Chuck Robbins (CEO); Frank A. Calderoni (CFO)
- Products: Webex App, Webex Suite, Webex Meeting, Webex Messaging, Webex Calling, Webex Contact Center, Webex Devices
- Revenue: US$380 million (2006)
- Number of employees: 10,000+ (2015)
- Parent: Cisco Systems
- Website: www.webex.com

Webex by Cisco is an American subsidiary of Cisco Systems that develops and sells web conferencing, videoconferencing and contact center as a service applications. It was founded as WebEx Communications, Inc., in 1995 and acquired by Cisco Systems in May 2007. Its headquarters are in San Jose, California.

Its software products include Webex App, Webex Suite, Webex Meetings, Webex Messaging, Webex Calling, Webex Contact Center, and Webex Devices. All Webex products are part of the Cisco Systems collaboration portfolio.

== History ==
WebEx Communications, Inc., was founded in 1995 by Subrah Iyar and Min Zhu. It had its initial public offering in July 2000. WebEx was listed on the NASDAQ National Market, and then the NASDAQ Global Select Market, when that was introduced in 2006.

The company acquired Intranets.com in 2005, providing entrance into the small- and mid-size business market through the company's customer base of businesses with fewer than 100 employees. It acquired the ability to offer online collaboration tools such as discussion forums, document sharing and calendaring while Intranets.com provided access to the Webex communications environment for its customers.

In July 2006, AOL and Webex launched a business version of AOL's instant messaging software, AIM Pro, with additional features to help workers collaborate using conferencing tools offered by Webex.

On September 26, 2006, the company announced plans to offer a web collaboration "mashup" platform called "Webex Connect".

In May 2007, Cisco acquired WebEx for $3.2 billion.

At the time of the acquisition, all Webex applications were built on the MediaTone platform and supported by the Webex MediaTone Network (originally called the Webex interactive network), a global network intended for use with on-demand programs. The network was designed by Shaun Bryant, Webex's Chief Network Architect, and Zaid Ali Sr, Network Architect, to be one of the first SaaS platforms on the Internet.

On November 17, 2014, Cisco announced an evolution of Webex called Project Squared. On March 17, 2015 this effort was re-branded as Cisco Spark.

On April 18, 2018, Cisco announced that Cisco Spark would be combined into the Cisco Webex platform. On this same date, Cisco rebranded all of the rest of its Spark products to Webex, including the Spark Room Kit—now Webex Room Kit—and Spark Board—now Webex Board.

On May 15, 2020, during the COVID-19 pandemic, Cisco CFO Kelly Kramer reported in the month of April 2020, it had 500 million meeting attendees, and that equated to 25 billion meeting minutes, using its video-conferencing application Webex.

In September 2020, Cisco launched a new platform Webex Classrooms for virtual homeroom encounters.

On October 26, 2021, Cisco launched an update aimed to enhance virtual and hybrid in-person meetings and events, using AI-powered technology for its Webex portfolio.

In May 2024, Cisco and Tata Communications partnered to launch Webex Calling in India.

== Services ==
The WebEx Connect product allows for custom communication workflows, such as those used in customer relationship management. The product allows plug-ins to the WebEx platform to connect to popular messaging and social media platforms.

Defunct products include a business version of AOL's instant messaging software, AIM Pro, with additional features to help workers collaborate using conferencing tools offered by Webex.

== Related acquisitions by Cisco ==
In October 2020, Cisco acquired BabbleLabs.

In May 2021, Cisco acquired Slido, a Slovak audience-interaction platform. Slido was subsequently integrated into Webex while continuing to be offered as a standalone product.

In February 2021, Cisco acquired imimobile, a provider of communications platform as a service (CPaaS) solutions for its Webex collaboration portfolio IMImobile.

== Legal proceedings and inquiries ==
=== Goldman Sachs securities fraud investigation ===
As a result of a securities fraud investigation initiated by the SEC and by various state Attorney General offices, Goldman Sachs faced charges of issuing unfair research, including coverage of WebEx, and IPO violations for the period 1999 to 2001. Webex management allegedly dictated to Goldman Sachs analysts what the research should and should not include. Webex maintains the management's information was accurate. Another charge accuses Goldman Sachs of violating securities law in its allocation of shares in WebEx's initial public offering.

=== Raindance lawsuit for patent infringement ===
On September 27, 2005, Webex sued Raindance Communications, Inc., a competitor, for patent infringement. On October 14, 2005, Raindance filed a countersuit against Webex for patent infringement. Both parties sought both damages and an injunction enjoining further acts they claim to be infringing on patents. On March 31, 2006, the parties agreed to the dismissal of both actions, releases of claims for past infringement, payments associated with those releases, and cross-licenses to each other's patents. The agreement resulted in Webex receiving 1 million dollars from Raindance.

== See also ==
- Collaborative software
- Comparison of web conferencing software
- Zoom (software)
