= Whiteboarding =

Shared workspace for collaborative work

Kerika's graphical Wiki approach

Whiteboarding is the placement of shared files on an on-screen shared notebook or whiteboard. Videoconferencing and data conferencing software often lets documents as on a physical whiteboard.

In hybrid whiteboarding, special handwriting detection software allows for physical whiteboards to be shared with remote and distant users, often allowing for the simultaneous addition of digital content.

Whiteboarding sessions — both in-office and virtual — provide teams with a collaborative, creative environment for brainstorming new ideas and solving problems. Without a defined structure in place, however, these sessions can quickly unravel and get off track.

With this type of software, several people can work on the image at the same time, each seeing changes the others make in near-real time.

Electronic whiteboarding was included at least as early as 1996 in the CoolTalk tool in Netscape Navigator 3.0.
