= GoToMyPC =

Remote desktop software

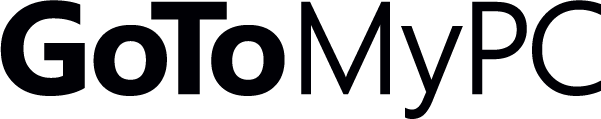
- Original author: ExpertCity
- Developer: GoTo
- Release: 1998; 28 years ago
- Stable release: Version 2025.5.4288 / May 14, 2025; 14 months ago
- Available in: English
- Type: Remote desktop
- Website: get.gotomypc.com

GoToMyPC is remote desktop software that allows users to access computers remotely using a web browser or desktop app. The platform was designed to enable individuals to access files, applications, and networks on their remote computers as if they were physically present at the machine. GoToMyPC offers features such as file transfer, remote printing, and multi-monitor support. It is compatible with various operating systems, and can be accessed from multiple device types, including computers, tablets, and smartphones. The service is typically used to facilitate remote work, technical support, and access to resources while away from the primary workstation.

GoToMyPC was developed by ExpertCity and launched in 1998. Citrix Systems acquired ExpertCity in 2004 and maintained the GoToMyPC brand and services. Citrix spun off the GoTo products, which were acquired by LogMeIn (which would later adopt the GoTo name as a company in 2022) in early 2017. There are three versions: "Personal", "Pro", and "Corporate".

== History ==
Klaus Schauser co-founded ExpertCity, then a privately held company based in Santa Barbara, California, led GoToMyPC's design and development, focusing on "ease-of-use form over function". ExpertCity launched GoToMyPC in 1998, starting with a "Personal" version and followed by a "Corporate" edition months later. As part of a "reverse demand" strategy, ExpertCity marketed the products to individual employees, instead of corporations, because of its limited resources as a startup.

In mid-2001, GoToMyPC required Microsoft Windows on both ends, but ExpertCity planned to release versions compatible with Linux, Macintosh, Palm, Solaris, and Windows CE. The company also planned to create an "infrequent flier" plan for users who only need access during occasional travel times.

In 2003, "GoToMyPC Pro" was launched and targeted at small businesses. In December, Citrix Systems agreed to purchase ExpertCity for $225 million in cash and stock in a deal that closed in 2004. The acquisition was Citrix's largest to date. Citrix planned to keep the GoToMyPC brand, pricing, and services, and let ExpertCity operate from its headquarters in Santa Barbara under Andreas von Blottnitz, who had served as ExpertCity's chief executive officer.

In 2006, the Canadian firm 01 Communique filed a patent infringement lawsuit against Citrix, claiming they filed for a patent in 2000 and obtained one from the United States Patent and Trademark Office (USPTO) in August 2005 for their remote access software I'm InTouch. Following an inter partes reexamination, the USPTO issued a Right of Appeal Notice confirming that all of 01 Communique's claims were patentable. 01 Communique's lawsuit requested "unspecified financial damages" covering August 2005 to the settlement date. In July 2010, the patent infringement claims were upheld. In May 2014, Citrix filed a complaint alleging patent infringement by 01 Communique's "I'm InTouch Meeting" and requesting a "declaratory judgment" against 01 Communique alleging that GoToMyPC did not infringe the original patent. In October, the two companies reached an agreement and withdrew their complaints against each other.

== Reception ==
Following GoToMyPC's launch, beta user Greg Alwang wrote a positive review of the software for PC Magazine. He said the file transfer features were "basic" compared to those offered by competitor pcAnywhere, but complimented the product's usability and concluded, "GoToMyPC is revolutionary, and pcAnywhere is evolutionary."

In the 2000s, GoToMyPC received several recognitions for its performance, including Laptop magazine's "Ultimate Choice Award" for remote access in the software category (2004), PC Magazine's "Best Utility Product" (2003), PC World's "World Class Award for Best Remote Access Software" (2004), and Windows IT Pro's "Readers Choice Award for Best Remote Control Product". In 2003, Network World's Toni Kistner recommended GoToMyPC for users who require remote access to large data stores on desktops or local applications too costly to operate on home computers, or who do not want to lose important desktop data should their personal computer be lost or stolen.

In a 2011 review of GoToMyPC's iPad app, Jeffrey Wilson of PC Magazine said, "The app works as advertised—I was able to control my work PC from a distance—but it could benefit from a more responsive interaction with the host computer." Tony Bradley of PC World said that he saw GoToMyPC as an "insurance plan" that would allow him to use applications or data from his laptop on his iPad, but he was unsure if it would be worth the monthly subscription fee.

In 2013, the International Data Corporation named GoToMyPC the best remote access option for the fifth consecutive year.

== See also ==
- Comparison of remote desktop software
- GoTo (US company)
- GoTo Meeting
