= GoTo Meeting =

Video conferencing service

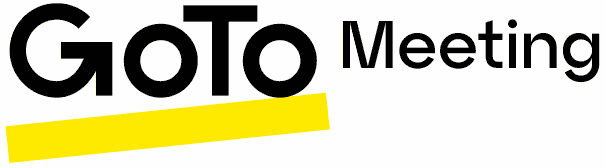
- Developer: LogMeIn
- Initial release: July 2004; 21 years ago
- Operating system: Windows; macOS; Linux; ChromeOS; Android; iOS
- Available in: de, es, en, fr, it, pt
- Type: Video conferencing
- License: Proprietary
- Website: www.goto.com/meeting

GoTo Meeting, previously known as GoToMeeting, is a web conferencing tool developed by GoTo. This online meeting software is designed for business and professional use and enables users to host and join virtual meetings, share screens, collaborate in real-time, and communicate through audio and video.

In late 2015, Citrix announced plans to spin off the GoTo Meeting business as a standalone subsidiary with a market value around $4 billion. In July 2016, Citrix and LogMeIn disclosed their agreement to merge the GoTo line of products.

== Technology ==
GoTo Meeting is designed to broadcast the desktop view of a host computer to a group of computers connected to the host through the Internet. Transmissions are protected with high-security encryption and optional passwords. By combining a web-hosted subscription service with software installed on the host computer, communication can pass through highly restrictive firewalls.

== History ==
GoTo Meeting was developed in July 2004 using the remote access and screen sharing technology from GoToMyPC and LogMeIn Resolve (then GoToAssist) to allow web conferencing. The later release of GoTo Webinar in 2006 and GoTo Training in 2010 expanded GoTo Meeting capabilities to accommodate larger audiences. In February 2017, GoTo Meeting became a product of LogMeIn as a result of a merger between LogMeIn and Citrix's GoTo business.

== Editions and features ==
GoTo Meeting features include:

- Mobile apps for iPad, iPhone, and Android devices
- Encryption and authentication security provided by a Transport Layer Security (TLS) website with end-to-end 128-bit Advanced Encryption Standard (AES) encryption and optional passwords
- Application sharing
- Business messaging
- Mobile meetings
- Multi-monitor support
- Meeting recordings and transcriptions
- Toll-free audio conferencing via VoIP
- Video conferencing
- Health Insurance Portability and Accountability Act (HIPAA) compliance

== See also ==
- GoTo (US company)
- Comparison of web conferencing software
- Videotelephony
