= Web conferencing =

Online interaction and collaborative

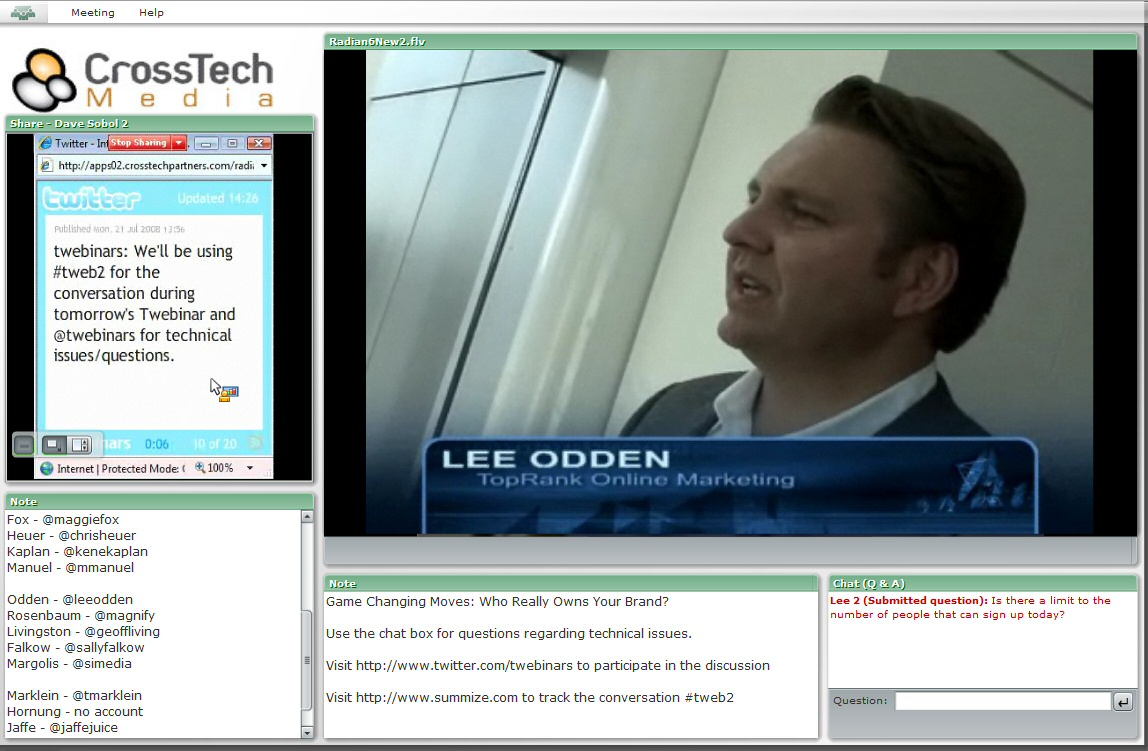
Example of a web conferencing computer screen

Web conferencing is used as an umbrella term for various types of online conferencing and collaborative services including webinars (web seminars), webcasts, and web meetings. Sometimes it may be used also in the more narrow sense of the peer-level web meeting context, in an attempt to disambiguate it from the other types known as collaborative sessions.

In general, web conferencing is made possible by Internet technologies, particularly on TCP/IP connections. Services may allow real-time point-to-point communications as well as multicast communications from one sender to many receivers. It offers data streams of text-based messages, voice and video chat to be shared simultaneously, across geographically dispersed locations. Applications for web conferencing include meetings, training events, lectures, or presentations from a web-connected computer to other web-connected computers.

== Installation and operation ==
Web conferencing software is invoked by all participants in a web meeting. Some technologies include software and functionality that differs for presenters and attendees. Software may run as a web browser application (often relying on Adobe Flash, Java, or WebRTC to provide the operational platform). Other web conferencing technologies require download and installation of software on each participant's computer, which is invoked as a local application. Many web conferencing vendors provide the central connectivity and provisioning of meeting "ports" or "seats" as a hosted web service, while others allow the web conference host to install and run the software on its own local servers. Another installation option from certain vendors allows for use of a proprietary computer appliance that is installed at the hosting company's physical location.

Depending on the technology being used, participants may speak and listen to audio over standard telephone lines or via computer microphones and speakers. Some products allow for use of a webcam to display participants, while others may require their own proprietary encoding or externally provided encoding of a video feed (for example, from a professional video camera connected via an IEEE 1394 interface) that is displayed in the session.

Vendor-hosted web conferencing is usually licensed as a service based on one of three pricing models: a fixed cost per user per minute, a monthly or annual flat fee allowing unlimited use with a fixed maximum capacity per session, or a sliding rate fee based on the number of allowed meeting hosts and per-session participants (number of "seats").

Visual materials are typically shown in one of two ways. The web conferencing software may show the whole or part of the presenter's computer screen. Renderable files (in formats such as PDF or Microsoft PowerPoint) can be displayed by the presenter uploading them and a computer server converting them into a form convenient for streaming.

== Etymology ==
The term "webinar" is a portmanteau of web and seminar, meaning a presentation, lecture, or workshop that is transmitted over the web. The coined term has been attacked for improper construction, since "inar" is not a valid root. Webinar was included on the Lake Superior University 2008 List of Banished Words, but was included in the Merriam-Webster dictionary that same year.

The term "webcast" derives from its original similarity to a radio or television broadcast. Early usage referred purely to transmission and consumption of streaming audio and video via the World Wide Web. Over time, webcast software vendors have added many of the same functional capabilities found in webinar software, blurring the distinction between the two terms. Webcasts are now likely to allow audience response to polls, text communication with presenters or other audience members, and other two-way communications that complement the consumption of the streamed audio/video content.

== Features ==
Other typical features of a web conference include:

- Slideshow presentations – where images are presented to the audience and markup tools and a remote mouse pointer are used to engage the audience while the presenter discusses slide content.
- Live or streaming video – where full-motion webcam, digital video camera or multi-media files are pushed to the audience.
- VoIP – Real-time audio communication through the computer via use of headphones and speakers.
- Web tours – where URLs, data from forms, cookies, scripts and session data can be pushed to other participants enabling them to be pushed through web-based logons, clicks, etc. This type of feature works well when demonstrating websites where users themselves can also participate.
- Meeting recording – where presentation activity is recorded on the client side or server side for later viewing and/or distribution.
- Whiteboarding with annotation (allowing the presenter and/or attendees to highlight or mark items on the slide presentation. Or, simply make notes on a blank whiteboard.)
- Text chat – For live question and answer sessions, limited to the people connected to the meeting. Text chat may be public (echoed to all participants) or private (between two participants).
- Polls and surveys (allows the presenter to conduct questions with multiple choice answers directed to the audience)
- Screen sharing/desktop sharing/application sharing (where participants can view anything the presenter currently has shown on their screen. Some screen sharing applications allow for remote desktop control, allowing participants to manipulate the presenters screen, although this is not widely used.)
- File sharing – sending a file to other users

== Standards ==
Web conferencing technologies are not standardized, which has reduced interoperability and transparency and increased platform dependence, security issues, cost and market segmentation. In 2003, the IETF established a working group to establish a standard for web conferencing, called "Centralized Conferencing (xcon)". The planned deliverables of xcon include:

- A binary floor control protocol. Binary Floor Control Protocol (BFCP) published as RFC 4582
- A mechanism for membership and authorization control
- A mechanism to manipulate and describe media "mixing" or "topology" for multiple media types (audio, video, text)
- A mechanism for notification of conference related events/changes (for example a floor change)

=== Deployment models ===
Web conferencing is available with three models: hosting service, software and appliance.

An appliance, unlike the online hosted solution, is offered as hardware. It is also known as "in-house" or "on-premises" web conferencing. It is used to conduct live meetings, remote training, or presentations via the Internet.

== History ==
Real-time text chat facilities such as IRC appeared in the late 1980s. Web-based chat and instant messaging software appeared in the mid-1990s. The PLATO computer learning system allowed students to collaborate on networked computers to accomplish learning tasks as early as the 1960s, but the early networking was not accomplished via the World Wide Web and PLATO's collaborative goals were not consistent with the presenter-audience dynamic typical of web conferencing systems. PLATO II, in 1961, featured two users at once.

In 1992, InSoft Inc. launched Communique, a software-based Unix teleconferencing product for workstations that enabled video/audio/data conferencing. Communique supported as many as 10 users, and included revolutionary features such as application sharing, audio controls, text, graphics, and whiteboarding which allowed networked users to share and manipulate graphic objects and files using simple paint tools.

Several point-to-point and private-network video conferencing products were introduced in the 1990s, such as CU-SeeMe, which was used to link selected schools around the United States of America in real-time collaborative communications as part of the Global Schoolhouse project from Global SchoolNet.

In May 1995, PictureTel announced LiveShare Plus as a general-use data collaboration product for Windows-based personal computers. The software allowed application sharing, user-granted control of a remote PC, shared whiteboard markup, file transfer, and text messaging. List price was given as $249 per computer. PictureTel referenced an agreement with Microsoft in its announcement press release, and a May 26, 1995 memo from Bill Gates to Microsoft executive staff and direct reports said "Our PictureTel screen sharing client allowing Window sharing should work easily across the Internet."

In May 1996, Microsoft announced NetMeeting as an included component in Internet Explorer 3.0. At the time, Microsoft called NetMeeting "the Internet's first real-time communications client that includes support for international conferencing standards and provides true multiuser application-sharing and data-conferencing capabilities."

In 1996, PlaceWare was founded as a spinoff from Xerox PARC. In November of that year, PlaceWare Auditorium was described in a public talk at Stanford University as allowing "one or more people to give an interactive, online, multimedia presentation via the Web to hundreds or thousands of simultaneous attendees; the presentation can include slides (made in PowerPoint or any GIF-image editor), live annotation on the slide images, real-time polls of the audience, live audio from the presenter and those asking questions, private text and audio conversations in the auditorium's "rows", and other features." PlaceWare Auditorium was formally announced in March 1997 at a price of $150 per simultaneous user.

Unveiled in 1996 by InSoft Inc., CoolTalk was a multimedia software tool that let PC users view data displayed on a shared whiteboard, exchange real-time messages via a chat tool or speak with each other via a TCP/IP voice connection. The product worked with Microsoft Sound System-compatible audio boards and was available in a 14.4-kbit/s version or 28.8-kbit/s version. CoolTalk was later packaged with popular Web browsers of the time. CoolTalk 14.4 and 28.8 sold for $49.95 and $69.95, respectively, in 1996.

In February 1998, Starlight Networks released StarLive! (the exclamation point being part of the product name). The press release said "customers can access familiar Web browser interfaces to view live and pre-recorded corporate presentations, along with synchronized slides. End users can communicate directly with the presenter using real-time chat technology and other Web-based collaboration tools."

In June 1998, PlaceWare 2.0 Conference Center was released, allowing up to 1000 live attendees in a meeting session.

In February 1999, ActiveTouch announced WebEx Meeting Center and the webex.com website. In July 1999 WebEx Meeting Center was formally released with a 1000-person meeting capacity demonstrated. In September of the same year, ActiveTouch changed its company name to WebEx.

In April 1999, Vstream introduced the Netcall product for web conferencing as "a fee-based Internet software utility that lets you send business presentations and other graphic information via e-mail to a Vstream server. Vstream converts the content, again using streaming technology, and makes the presentation available for viewing by up to 1,200 people at a time." Vstream changed the company name to Evoke Communications in 2000, with a further change to Raindance Communications in 2002. In February 2006, Raindance was acquired by the InterCall division of West Corporation.

In December 2003, Citrix Systems acquired Expertcity, giving it the GoToMyPC and GoToAssist products. The acquired company was renamed as the Citrix Online division of Citrix Systems. In July 2004, Citrix Online released GoToMeeting as its first generic web conferencing product. In June 2006, GoToWebinar was added, allowing additional registration and reporting functionality along with larger capacity in sessions.

In 2003, Emil Ivov, launched Jitsi, originally presented as his thesis at the University of Strasbourg. Afterward, development continued and the project consolidated as an open-source web conferencing alternative.

In January 2003, Macromedia acquired Presedia, including the Breeze Presentation product. Breeze Live was added with the 4.0 release of Macromedia Breeze to support web conferencing. In April 2005, Adobe Systems announced acquisition of Macromedia (completed in December 2005) and changed the Breeze product name to Adobe Connect.

A trademark for the term WEBinar (first three letters capitalized) was registered in 1998 by Eric R. Korb (Serial Number 75478683, USPTO) and was reassigned to InterCall. The trademark registration was cancelled in 2007. Learn.com filed a claim for the term "webinar" without regard to font or style in 2006 (Serial Number 78952304, USPTO). That trademark claim was abandoned in 2007 and no subsequent filing has been made.

During the COVID-19 pandemic, webinars became the norm of teaching and instruction in numerous schools, universities and workplaces around the world. This new form of transferring knowledge challenged institutions and instructors, and it fostered new practices of teaching. At the same time this new form of teaching also demonstrated the advantages of moving these events online, as virtual conferences were found to be more inclusive, more affordable, less time-consuming and more accessible worldwide, especially for early-career researchers.

== See also ==
- Comparison of web conferencing software
- Collaborative software
- Mobile VoIP
- Electronic meeting system
- Hybrid event
- Videoconferencing
- Web television
