= GoTo (US company) =

Software company

GoTo Technologies USA, Inc.
- Formerly: 3am Labs (2003–2006); LogMeIn Inc. (2006–2022)
- Type: Private
- Industry: Computer software
- Founded: 2003; 23 years ago in Budapest, Hungary
- Headquarters: Boston, Massachusetts, US
- Key people: Rich Veldran (CEO)
- Products: Cloud-based software as a service
- Revenue: US$1.262 billion (2019)
- Owners: Francisco Partners (since 2020); Elliott Management (since 2020)
- Number of employees: 3,974 (2019)
- Website: goto.com

GoTo Technologies USA, Inc., formerly LogMeIn Inc., is a software as a service (SaaS) company that provides unified communication and IT management software. The company was founded in 2003, and is based in Boston, Massachusetts. On February 2, 2022, the company was rebranded from LogMeIn to GoTo.

With the rebranding to GoTo, the company also announced the launch of a unified application featuring two main products:

- LogMeIn Resolve for IT management and support
- GoTo Connect for business communications

On December 17, 2019, LogMeIn announced an agreement to be sold for $4.3 billion to Francisco Partners and Evergreen Coast Capital Corp., which is a private equity affiliate of Elliott Management Corporation. The deal closed on August 31, 2020. In 2022, GoTo announced the purchase of the mobile device management company Miradore.

== History ==
Logo as of 2007

Former logo before the rebranding

LogMeIn was founded in 2003 in Budapest as 3am Labs, and changed its name in 2006.

In 2006, 3am Labs acquired Hamachi, a VPN product.

LogMeIn, Inc., completed an initial public offering in 2009. Trading of LogMeIn, Inc., shares on the NASDAQ Global Market commenced on July 1, 2009.

In 2011, the company began a move into cloud services for the Internet of things by acquiring Pachube, which would later become the Xively service. In May 2014, it added to this initiative by acquiring Ionia Corp., which specializes in integrating connected objects.

LogMeIn, Inc., acquired Bold Software, LLC, in 2012.

The company abruptly discontinued LogMeIn Free on January 21, 2014, giving users only a seven-day grace period to migrate to LogMeIn Pro.

LogMeIn acquired Meldium for $15M in September 2014 and retired the Meldium product offering in July 2017.

On October 9, 2015, LogMeIn acquired LastPass for US$110 million. On December 14, 2021, the company announced that LastPass would spin off into its own cloud-based security company. The spin-off was completed in May 2024.

In July 2016, LogMeIn announced in a merger with Citrix's GoTo products using a Reverse Morris Trust.

In February 2017, LogMeIn completed a merger with GetGo, the corporate spin-off of the GoTo product line from Citrix Systems.

In February 2018, the company announced the sale of Xively to Google for $50M. Also in February 2018, the company announced the acquisition of Jive Communications for $342M.

On August 31, 2020, Elliott Management Corporation, by its affiliate Evergreen Coast Capital, and Francisco Partners completed their acquisition of LogMeIn, and LogMeIn's stock was delisted from NASDAQ.

On February 2, 2022, LogMeIn was rebranded as GoTo, restoring the original brand that ExpertCity created in 1998, before Citrix Systems acquired it in 2004.

On January 28, 2025, GoTo products have been rebranded as LogMeIn.

== Products ==
The company's product portfolio is split into two business units; unified communications and collaboration, and IT management & support. The products include:

- GoTo Business Communication Products
  - GoTo Connect
  - GoTo Contact Center
  - GoTo Meeting
  - GoTo Webinar
  - GoTo Training
  - Grasshopper
- LogMeIn IT Management & Support Products
  - LogMeIn Resolve
  - LogMeIn Rescue
  - LogMeIn Miradore
  - LogMeIn Pro
  - LogMeIn Central
  - GoToMyPC
  - Hamachi

== See also ==
- Comparison of remote desktop software
