= LogMeIn Resolve =

Cloud-based remote support platform

- Industry: Technology
- Genre: Remote support, remote monitoring and management, MDM, and UEM
- Founded: 1997
- Headquarters: Boston, Massachusetts
- Key people: Rich Veldran, CEO
- Website: Official Webpage

LogMeIn Resolve (formerly GoToAssist & GoTo Resolve) is a cloud-based unified endpoint management platform developed by LogMeIn. The software incorporates remote monitoring and management (RMM) and mobile device management (MDM) features in a single interface. LogMeIn Resolve is primarily used by IT support teams and managed service providers to perform remote support, device monitoring, and ticketing.

== Development ==
GoToAssist was originally developed by Expertcity, which was founded in Santa Barbara, California, in 1997. GoToAssist Remote Support enables users to access and control remote computers and other Internet-connected devices in order to provide technical support. The solution allows a desktop view of a host computer to be manipulated from an IT computer. The two machines are connected through a TCP/IP network. One of Expertcity's innovations was to employ the Internet for connectivity, protecting transmissions with high-security encryption and multiple passwords. By combining a web-based software service with software installed on the host computer, transmissions could be passed through highly restrictive firewalls.

In December 2003, Citrix Systems of Fort Lauderdale, Florida, acquired the GoToAssist service and its developer, Expertcity, for $225 million, half cash and half stock. In 2017, LogMeIn, a SaaS company in Boston, completed the acquisition (through merger) with Citrix's GetGo family of products including GoToAssist. GoToAssist joined former competitor LogMeIn Rescue to create the Rescue family of support products. In May 2025, Acronis announced a partnership that brings native backup and disaster recovery features into the LogMeIn Resolve platform.

== Editions ==
GoToAssist has gone through a series of editions. Most recently, in 2018, the technician console, a desktop application, was reconfigured to a completely browser-based experience and GoToAssist was rebranded RescueAssist by LogMeIn.

== See also ==
- unified endpoint management
- remote monitoring and management
- mobile device management
- GoTo (US company)
