= Multipoint =

Multipoint may refer to:

- Multi-point fuel injection, an injection scheme for metering fuel into an internal combustion engine
- Multipoint (geography), a point on the Earth that touches the border of several distinct territories
- Multipoint ground, a type of electrical installation which involves the creation of many alternate paths for electrical energy to find its way back to ground
- Multipoint videoconferencing, simultaneous videoconferencing among three or more remote points by means of a Multipoint Control Unit (MCU)
- Windows MultiPoint Mouse SDK, a Microsoft technology which enables multiple users to share a single PC using multiple mice
- Windows MultiPoint Server, a Microsoft operating system which enables a multiseat configuration
- Bluetooth Multipoint and Advanced Multipoint, a standard for connecting a Bluetooth headset to two (and sometimes more) devices at the same time.
- MultiPoint class in the Simple Features standard representing a collection of geographic points

== See also ==
- Multi-touch
