= Multiseat desktop virtualization =

MultiSeat Desktop Virtualization is a method by which a common desktop PC, with extra keyboards, mice, and video screens directly attached to it, can be used to install, load, and concurrently run multiple operating systems. These operating systems can be the same across all "seats" or they can be different. It is similar to server based computing only in the fact that one mainframe is supporting multiple users. On the other hand, it is different because the "terminals" (or seats, as they are known in multiseat jargon) are composed of nothing more than the regular keyboard, monitor and mouse, and these devices are plugged directly into the PC. USB hubs can be used for cable management of the keyboards and mice, and extra video cards (typically dual or quad output) may need to be installed.

== Introduction ==
It is commonly known that modern day PCs are extremely powerful and have substantial excess CPU processing power. In fact, most desktop applications do not use the multi-core capabilities of today's CPUs. When an application is launched it runs on the first core, and when a second application is launched, it continues to run on the first core. That process continues (with the second and subsequent cores basically idling) until the original core gets very busy. At that point, the operating system tells the new applications to run on the second and subsequent cores.

=== Server based computing ===
Server based computing has been around for a long time specifically to take advantage of this excess CPU power and allow multiple users to share it. It started in the 1950s and 1960s with batch processing and has taken its current day form with Citrix and Terminal Services. nComputing and Microsoft Multipoint are current iterations of the same thin client technology. The typical problem with this type of system is that it is dependent upon one operating system and one set of applications and there are many software titles that are not allowed to be shared among multiple users. That means that the first user of a program will get access but subsequent users will not. Another problem is that the video is not delivered via native means. It is usually delivered via network traffic and must rely upon the "packetizing" methods employed using TCP-IP. This means that video does not run very well, especially if the network traffic is busy.

=== Server virtualization ===
Virtualization can solve some of these problems. Virtualization is a method by which the "guest" operating system runs on top of, while being separated from the "bare metal" hardware. This means that multiple "guest" operating systems can be run, solving the problem of single user applications not being able to be launched for multiple, concurrent users. Xen used in conjunction with Citrix, or VMware used in conjunction with Microsoft Terminal Services are examples of this technology. Although it is still server based computing and relies upon a "thin" or a "fat" client to display the video output of the session, it allows multiple users to launch the same application because they are launching totally different instances of the same application, in different "guest" operating systems. But the issue still remains that video does not run very well because it still relies upon the network to deliver video. It is also extremely complicated to install and maintain, requiring extra training and knowledge.

=== Multiseat desktop virtualization differences ===
Multiseat desktop virtualization is an entirely new methodology which combines the cost saving benefits and ease of maintenance of server based computing, the time savings of hardware agnostic cloning, and the capabilities of desktop virtualization, with the performance capabilities of real PC functionality. It takes advantage of this fact to enable ordinary users to install a multiseat PC giving 2 "seats" with a dual-core CPU or 4 "seats" with a quad-core CPU. The operating system of this PC is initially installed just like a regular PC. Regular PC users can install and use this type of product without having to install servers, or know how to manage complicated, server based computing or server based virtualization products. It has the combined benefits of a Type 1 hypervisor and a Type 2 hypervisor virtual machine. It does this with the efficiency of a Type 1 hypervisor while maintaining the portability of a Type 2 hypervisor.

Type	Standard server/TCP-IP based computing	Virtualized server/TCP-IP based computing	MultiSeat Desktop Virtualization
Examples	nComputing, Thin clients (HP, Neoware, Wyse, Microsoft Multipoint)	VMware View, Citrix XenDesktop	Multiseat configuration, Userful, Black Box VirtuaCore, Fiddlehead
Can run all single user applications	No	Yes	Yes
Can run multimedia without buffering	No	No	Yes
Easy to install	No	No	Yes
Each "seat" has their own IP and MAC address	No	Yes	Yes
Each "seat" cloned image is hardware agnostic across different sets of hardware	No	Yes	Yes
