= Multiseat =

Multiseat may refer to:

- Multiseat constituency, in voting systems
- Multiseat configuration or "multiterminal", single computer which supports multiple independent users at the same time
