= Multiseat configuration =

Single computer that supports multiple local users at the same time

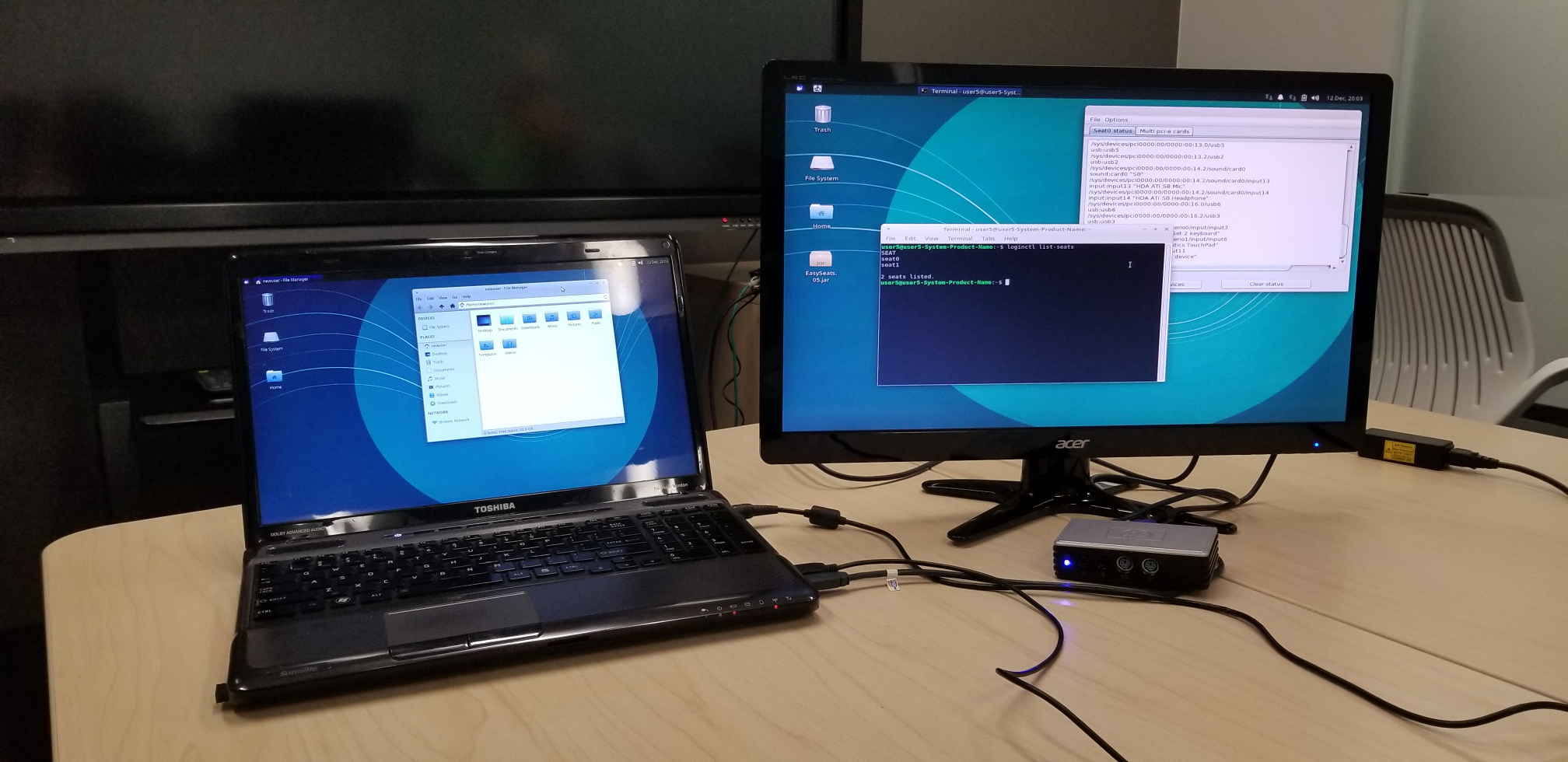
A laptop with an HP USB Multiseat adapter, running Linux

A multiseat, multi-station or multiterminal system is a single computer which supports multiple independent local users at the same time.

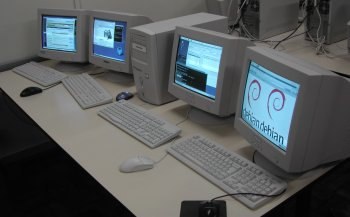
A multi-seat assembly encompassing four "seats", running Linux

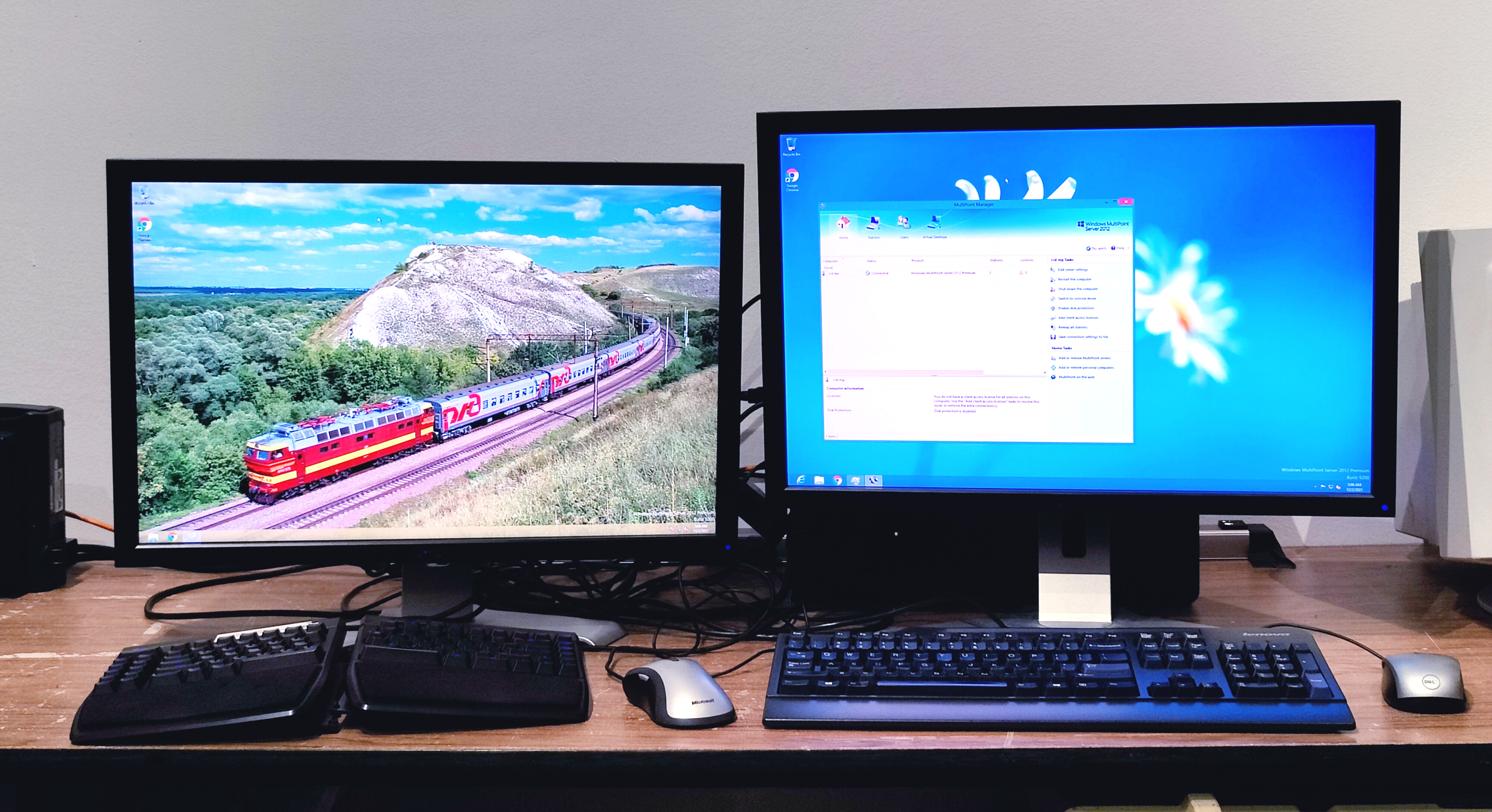
A two-seat system using Windows Multipoint Server

A "seat" consists of all hardware devices assigned to a specific workplace at which one user sits at and interacts with the computer. It consists of at least one graphics device (graphics card or just an output (e.g. HDMI/VGA/DisplayPort port) and the attached monitor/video projector) for the output and a keyboard and a mouse for the input. It can also include video cameras, sound cards and more.

== Motivation ==
Since the 1960s computers have been shared between users. Especially in the early days of computing when computers were extremely expensive the usual paradigm was a central mainframe computer connected to numerous terminals. With the advent of personal computing this paradigm has been largely replaced by personal computers (or one computer per user).

Multiseat setups are a return to this multiuser paradigm but based around a PC which supports a number of terminals per user, usually consisting of a screen, keyboard, and mouse.

In some situations a multiseat setup is more cost-effective because it is not necessary to buy separate motherboards, microprocessors, RAM, hard disks and other components for each user. For example, buying one high speed CPU, usually costs less than buying several slower CPUs.

== History ==
In the 1970s, it was very commonplace to connect multiple computer terminals to a single mainframe computer, even graphical terminals. Early terminals were connected with RS-232 type serial connections, either directly, or through modems. With the advent of Internet Protocol based networking, it became possible for multiple users to log into a host using telnet or – for a graphic environment – an X Window System "server". These systems would retain a physically secure "root console" for system administration and direct access to the host machine.

Support for multiple consoles in a PC running the X interface was implemented in 2001 by Miguel Freitas, using the Linux kernel and the X11 graphical system (at the time maintained by XFree86). This was done using a patch in the display server to execute several instances of X at the same time such that each one captures specific mouse and keyboard events and the graphical content. This method received the name of multiseat or multiterminal.

In 2001, Thinsoft BeTwin offered a multiseat solution for Windows, utilizing multiple graphics cards and peripherals attached to a single host PC.

In 2002 a Canadian company, Userful Corporation, released Userful Multiplier, a multiseat Linux software solution that enables up to 10 users to simultaneously share one computer. Earlier they worked on a kernel-based approach to a multi-station platform computer, but abandoned the idea due to a problem with multiple video card support.

Other solutions appeared in 2003, such Svetoslav Slavtchev, Aivils Stoss and James Simmons worked, with the evdev and Faketty approach modifying the Linux kernel and letting more than one user independently use the same machine. In that time, the Linux Console Project also proposed an idea to use multiple independent consoles and then multiple independent keyboards and mice in a project called "Backstreet Ruby". Backstreet Ruby is a kernel patch for the Linux kernel. It is a back port to Linux-2.4 of the Ruby kernel tree. The aim of the Linux Console developers is to enhance and reorganize the input, the console and the framebuffer subsystems in the Linux kernel, so they can work independent from each other and to allow multi-desktop operation. The Backstreet Ruby idea was never finished.

In 2005, the C3SL team (Center for Scientific Computing and Free Software), from the Federal University of Parana in Brazil, created a solution based on nested display servers, such as Xnest and Xephyr. With this solution, each nested display server runs in each screen of a host display server (e.g. Xorg) and a modification to the nested servers let each one exclusively acquire its mouse and keyboard. In 2008, the C3SL group released the Multiseat Display Manager (MDM) to ease the process of installation and configuration of a multiseat box. This group, also in 2008, conceived a live-CD for test purposes.

In 2007, NComputing entered the market with a Windows-based multiseat product, the X-series or Xtenda system, which uses a PCI add-in card to connect terminal units containing video, keyboard, mouse, and audio jacks, allowing 3 to 6 additional user seats to be added to a PC. The X-series also offered Linux compatibility.

In 2010, Microsoft began offering Windows MultiPoint Server, allowing one machine to host multiple users utilizing separate graphics cards and peripherals.

Automatic multiseat with USB docking stations is a feature of Fedora 17.

In 2022, a GitHub user named Garlett created a multiseat script based on DRM leasing that runs a separate instance of LabWC for each seat. This approach requires no nesting and only needs one video card.

=== Time line, commercial multiseat software evolution ===
- 1990, Solbourne cg30 running SunOS
- 1996–2005, Silicon Graphics InfiniteReality running Irix
- 1996, ThinSoft/BeTwin
- 1999, Ibik/ASTER
- 2001, ThinSoft BeTwin
- 2004, Open-Sense Solutions (Groovix)
- 2006, NComputing X-series
- 2010, Windows MultiPoint Server
- 2011, Black Box VirtuaCore
- 2013, LISTEQ BoXedVDI

== Requirements ==
=== Hardware requirements ===
Each user will require a monitor, keyboard and mouse connected to the host machine. For example, to make a four-head (four users) system would require four monitors, four keyboards, four mice and two dual-output, or one quad-output video card. USB keyboards and mice are typically recommended instead of PS/2 connections, as they can be connected to a USB hub. Additional devices and peripherals such as cameras, flash storage drives, card readers and touch screens could also be assigned to each seat. An alternative to multiple physical video cards and connections is DisplayLink over USB.

=== Software requirements ===
==== Linux ====
Multiseat on modern Linux systems is provided by systemd-logind and configured through the loginctl command or through ID_SEAT or ID_AUTOSEAT udev variables.

Certain specialized USB hubs, when connected, automatically results in a seat without any configuration required.

==== Microsoft Windows ====
For Windows 2000, XP and Vista operating systems, there are several commercial products to implement multiseat configurations for two or more seats.

An operating system designed specifically for multiseat setups entitled Windows MultiPoint Server was announced on February 24, 2010. It uses Remote Desktop (Terminal Services) technologies in Windows Server 2008 R2 to provide multiseat functionality. This functionality was incorporated into Windows Server proper as of Windows Server 2016 in a new server role entitled MultiPoint Services, but this server role was removed in Windows Server 2019 owing to Microsoft ceasing development of the service in 2018.

==== Virtualization-based setup ====
Instead of relying on operating system support for multiseat configuration, a hypervisor can be configured to run multiple virtual machines, each configured to interface one connected seat by I/O virtualization methods. Input devices can be attached to the virtual machines through USB Redirection, and entire GPUs can be attached through Intel VT-d.

The virtualization-based 2-seat and 7-seat systems with Unraid as the host operating system has been demonstrated. Each seat has exclusive control of one of the Windows guest operating systems running on the host. There is a dedicated high-end graphics card for each guest, which it takes full advantage of via the use of VT-d, making the system capable of hosting demanding video game sessions at full quality simultaneously on all seats.

== Case studies ==
=== World's largest multiseat computer deployment ===
In February, 2009, The Brazil Ministry of Education committed to deploy 350,000 Linux-based multiseat computing stations in more than 45,000 rural and urban schools across the country. The chosen companies to implement this project were the Canadian multiseat Linux software company Userful Corporation, and its Brazilian IT partner ThinNetworks.

=== Paraná Digital project ===
One of multiterminal's successful cases is happening at Paraná Digital project. It is creating multiterminal laboratories on 2000 public schools of the state of Paraná (Brazil). More than 1.5 million users will benefit from the 40,000 terminals when the project is finished. The laboratories have four-head multiterminals running Debian. The cost of all the hardware is 50% less than the normal price, and there is absolutely no cost with software. This project developer is C3SL (Center for Scientific Computing and Free Software).

=== Michigan State University research in Tanzania ===
Since 2008, electrical and computer engineering students from Michigan State University have installed multiterminal systems with internet access in three schools in Mto wa Mbu, Tanzania. The purpose of the project is to study the impact of having computer systems with internet access in an education system that cannot afford other educational resources such as books. The computer systems run Ubuntu 8.04 32-bit and utilize the open source Multiseat Display Manager created by C3SL. The research will eventually be used to present to government officials of third world countries in effort to showcase the positive impact of having cost-effective computing systems in schools. The project is sponsored by George and Vickie Rock and the Dow Chemical Company.

=== Notable installations ===
- Userful announced a deployment of 356,800 Linux-based virtual desktops in Brazil (February 2009)
- NComputing provided 180,000 one to one computing seats for K–12 students in the country of North Macedonia

== See also ==
- Thin client
- Multiseat desktop virtualization
- Multi-user
- Computer multitasking
- Time-sharing
- Dumb terminal
- Linux Terminal Server Project
- Mainframe
- Multi-monitor
- evdev
- NComputing
- Ndiyo
- Black Box VirtuaCore
- Windows MultiPoint
- X Window System
- X.Org Server
- Xephyr
- Multi-Pointer X
