= Lapfit =

Lapfit is a second screen for laptops introduced by Samsung in February 2009.

These monitors include DisplayLink USB graphics technology to allow a video connection using USB only.

== Features ==
- USB Plug & Play monitor, specially designed for laptops
- Magic Bright supports one-touch brightness adjustment
- 16:9 screen
- Eco-friendly monitor

== Specification ==
=== LD190G ===
Display	18.5" 1360*768
Viewing Angle(Hor/Ver)	170˚/160˚ (CR>10)
Color Support	16.7M
Brightness(Typical)	250 cd/m^{2}
Contrast Ratio(Typical)	DC 20000:1(1000:1) (Typ.)
Response Time(Typical)	5ms
Connectivity	15pin D-SUB, UbiSync
Power Consumption	20.0W(TYP); 22.0W(MAX)
Power Consumption(Standby)	≤ 2W(USB Mode) ≤ 1W (D-SUB)
Special Feature	Magic Clear, Easy Connection(UbiSync), Image Size, Touch Button, Windows Vista Basic
Weight	3.6 kg

=== LD220G ===
Display	21.5" 1920*1080
Viewing Angle(Hor/Ver)	170˚/160˚ (CR>10)
Color Support	16.7M
Brightness(Typical)	300 cd/m^{2}
Contrast Ratio(Typical)	DC 30000:1(1000:1) (Typ.)
Response Time(Typical)	5ms
Connectivity	15pin D-SUB, UbiSync
Power Consumption	40.0W(TYP); 44.0W(MAX)
Power Consumption(Standby)	< 1W
Special Feature	Magic Clear, Easy Connection(UbiSync), Image Size, Touch Button, Windows Vista Basic
Weight	4.5 kg

=== LD220Z ===
1920:1080

== See also ==
- Samsung
