= Martin King (inventor) =

Martin King, photographed in 2007

Martin (Towle) King (5 April 1950 – 15 September 2010) was an inventor and entrepreneur based in Seattle, WA, United States.

He was one of the creators of the T9 Predictive Text Entry system and founders of Tegic, the company that developed it.

Martin went on to found or co-found several companies and other organisations, including:

- Ndiyo
- Newnham Research (now DisplayLink)
- Exbiblio

Martin King died in September 2010 at the age of 60, at his home on Vashon Island.

Obituaries include those found at:

- Status-Q
- Puget Sound Business Journal
