= Lawrence, Pennsylvania =

Unincorporated community in Pennsylvania, US

Coordinates: 40°18′23″N 80°07′19″W

- Census-designated place
- Interactive map of Lawrence, Pennsylvania
- Country: United States
- State: Pennsylvania
- County: Washington

Area
  - Total: 0.41 sq mi (1.05 km^{2})
  - Land: 0.40 sq mi (1.03 km^{2})
  - Water: 0.012 sq mi (0.03 km^{2})

Population (2020)
  - Total: 1,236
  - Density: 3,121.3/sq mi (1,205.14/km^{2})
- Time zone: UTC-5 (Eastern (EST))
  - Summer (DST): UTC-4 (EDT)
- ZIP code: 15055
- Area code: 724
- FIPS code: 42-41968

Lawrence is a census-designated place located in Cecil Township, Washington County in the state of Pennsylvania. The community is a Pittsburgh suburb located in northern Washington County near the Allegheny County line. As of the 2010 census the population was 540 residents.

== Demographics ==
Historical population
| Census | Pop. | Note | %± |
|---|---|---|---|
| 2010 | 540 | | — |
| 2020 | 1,236 | | 128.9% |
U.S. Decennial Census

== History ==
Lawrence was mostly built as a miner's village for the Montour #4 Mine, which opened in 1914. Montour #4 closed in 1980 after flooding.

== Economy ==
Black Box Corporation is based in Lawrence.

== Education ==
It is in the Canon-McMillan School District.
