= Quentin Stafford-Fraser =

Computer programmer

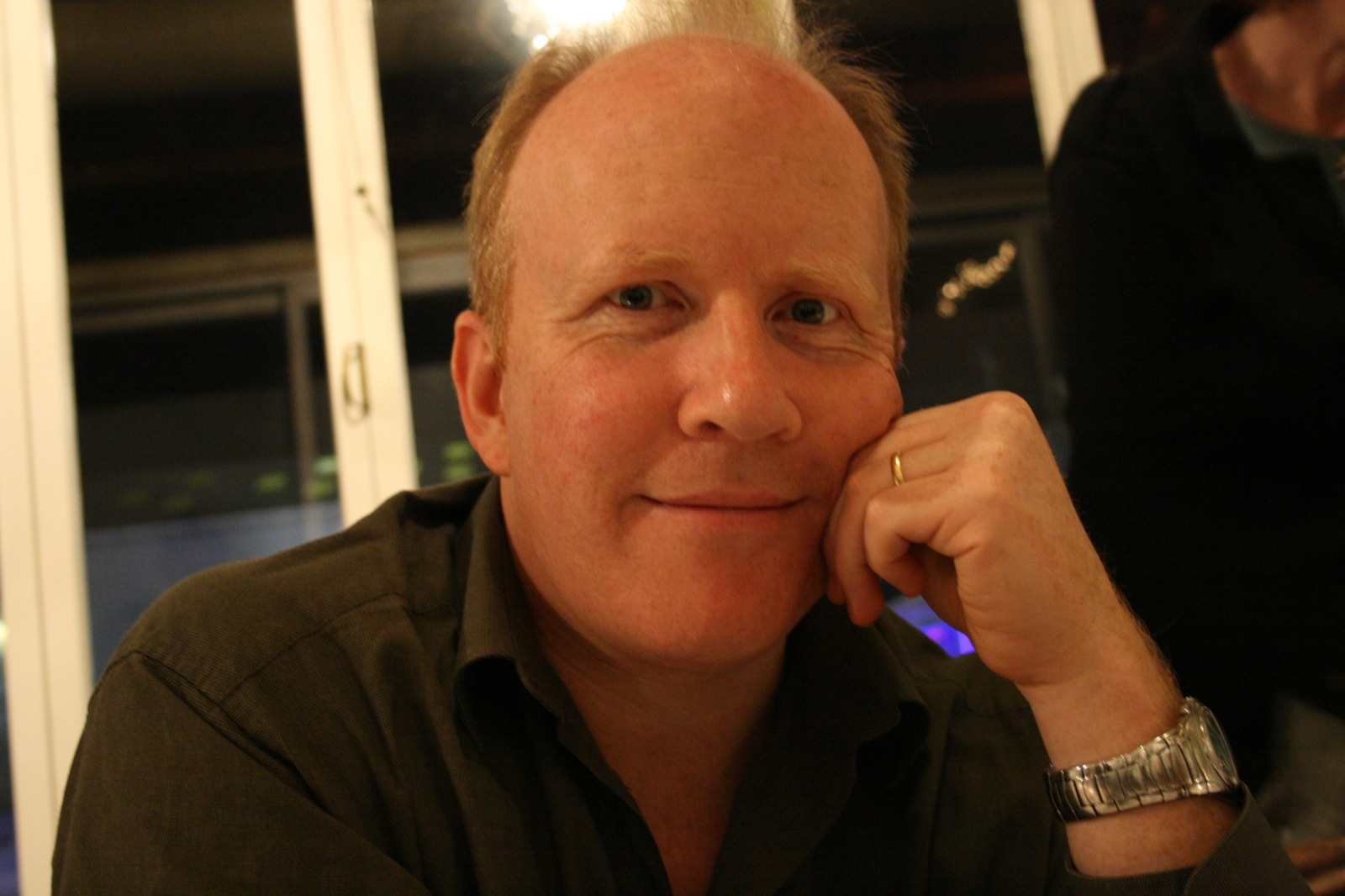
- Occupation: Computer scientist
- Known for: Trojan room coffee pot
- Website: quentinsf.com

James Quentin Stafford-Fraser is a computer scientist and entrepreneur based in Cambridge, England. He was one of the team that created the first webcam, the Trojan room coffee pot. Quentin pointed a camera at the coffee pot and wrote the XCoffee client program which allowed the image of the pot to be displayed on a workstation screen. When web browsers gained the ability to display images, the system was modified to make the coffee pot images available over HTTP and thus became the first webcam.

Quentin wrote the original VNC client (viewer) and server for the Windows operating system, while at the Olivetti Research Laboratory.

He is a regular public speaker and his work has attracted significant media coverage.

Quentin is also a part-time Senior Research Associate at the University of Cambridge Computer Lab. In 2013 he was a member of the winning team on Christmas University Challenge, representing Gonville & Caius College, Cambridge.

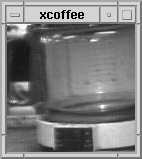
The famous coffee pot

== Earlier history ==
Quentin was educated at Haileybury before studying computer science at the University of Cambridge and in 1989 became the first Cambridge college Computer Officer, at his old college, Gonville and Caius College, before joining the Systems Research Group in the university's Computer Lab. Quentin is credited with operating the first web-server in the University of Cambridge, in 1992.

He created the Brightboard Interactive whiteboard project at Xerox EuroPARC in Cambridge, as part of his Ph.D. thesis.

== Companies founded ==
Quentin has founded or co-founded various companies and other organisations including:

- Newnham Research (now DisplayLink)
- Exbiblio
- The Ndiyo project
- Telemarq Ltd (of which he is currently CEO)
