= Ndiyo =

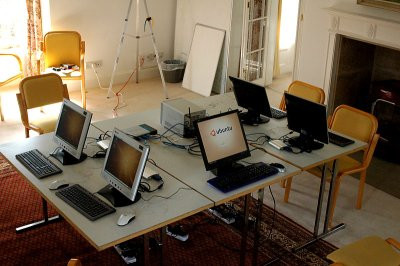
A 5-screen Ndiyo system based on a single PC, similar to those deployed in Internet cafes in Bangladesh, South Africa and Tanzania

Ndiyo was a non-profit organisation based out of Cambridge, United Kingdom, which aimed to promote networked computing that is "simple, affordable, open." Ndiyo, pronounced nn-dee-yo, is the Swahili word for "yes". The company developed an ultra-thin client called the nivo (network in, video out) based on Ubuntu Linux and other open-source software, for use especially in developing countries. The data sent to the clients over the network was pixel data, using a similar approach to Virtual Network Computing (VNC).

The project worked on the basis of multiple workstations running from a single PC. Quentin Stafford-Fraser, founder of the organisation, told The Economist "We can make computing more affordable by sharing it". The system allows a basic PC running linux to be shared by many users.

The Ndiyo Nivo was similar in concept to Sun Microsystems' Sun Ray virtual display thin client, but at sub-$100 and using only 2W, it was lower-cost and used much less power, making it more suitable for these kinds of situations.

In addition to its use by organisations within the United Kingdom, Ndiyo-based systems were deployed in internet cafes in Bangladesh and South Africa, and in Tanzanian Schools.

The Nivo technology went on to become the basis of DisplayLink, a company founded by members of the team.
