= Trojan Room coffee pot =

Predecessor of the webcam

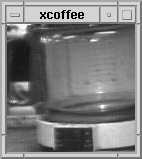
The coffee pot, as displayed in XCoffee

The Trojan Room coffee pot was a coffee machine located in the Computer Laboratory of the University of Cambridge, England. It was the subject of the world's first webcam, created by Quentin Stafford-Fraser and Paul Jardetzky in 1991.

To save people working in the building the disappointment of finding the coffee machine empty after making the trip to the room, a camera was set up providing a live picture of the coffee pot to all desktop computers on the office network. After the camera was connected to the Internet a few years later, the coffee pot gained international renown as a feature of the fledgling World Wide Web, until being retired in 2001.

== Development ==
The 128×128 px greyscale camera was connected to the laboratory's local network through a video capture card fitted on an Acorn Archimedes computer. Researcher Quentin Stafford-Fraser wrote the client software, dubbed XCoffee and employing the X Window System protocol, while his colleague Paul Jardetzky wrote the server program.

In 1993, web browsers gained the ability to display images; it soon became clear that this would be an easier way to make the picture available to users. The camera was connected to the Internet and the live picture became available via HTTP in November of the same year, by computer scientists Daniel Gordon and Martyn Johnson. It therefore became visible worldwide and grew into a popular landmark of the early web.

== Retirement ==
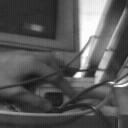
The last picture that the webcam ever took, showing three fingers about to switch the server off.

Following the laboratory's move to its current premises in the William Gates Building, the camera was eventually switched off, at 09:54 UTC on 22 August 2001. Coverage of the shutdown included front-page mentions in The Times and The Washington Post, as well as articles in The Guardian and Wired.

The last of the four or five coffee machines seen online, a Krups, was auctioned on eBay for £3,350 according to the German news website Der Spiegel. The pot was later refurbished pro bono by Krups employees, and was switched on again in the magazine's editorial office. Since the summer of 2016, the coffee maker is on permanent loan to the Heinz Nixdorf MuseumsForum in Paderborn.

== Legacy and cultural references ==
Spoofs of the Trojan Room coffee machine ranged from the Hyper Text Coffee Pot Control Protocol, a 1998 April Fools' Day specification for a communication protocol, to the 2002 video game Hitman 2: Silent Assassin, in which the player can destroy a "coffee camera" in a kitchen as a distraction. The coffee pot was also mentioned in the BBC Radio 4 drama The Archers on 24 February 2005.
