= Dual input =

Multiple touch input on a device challenge

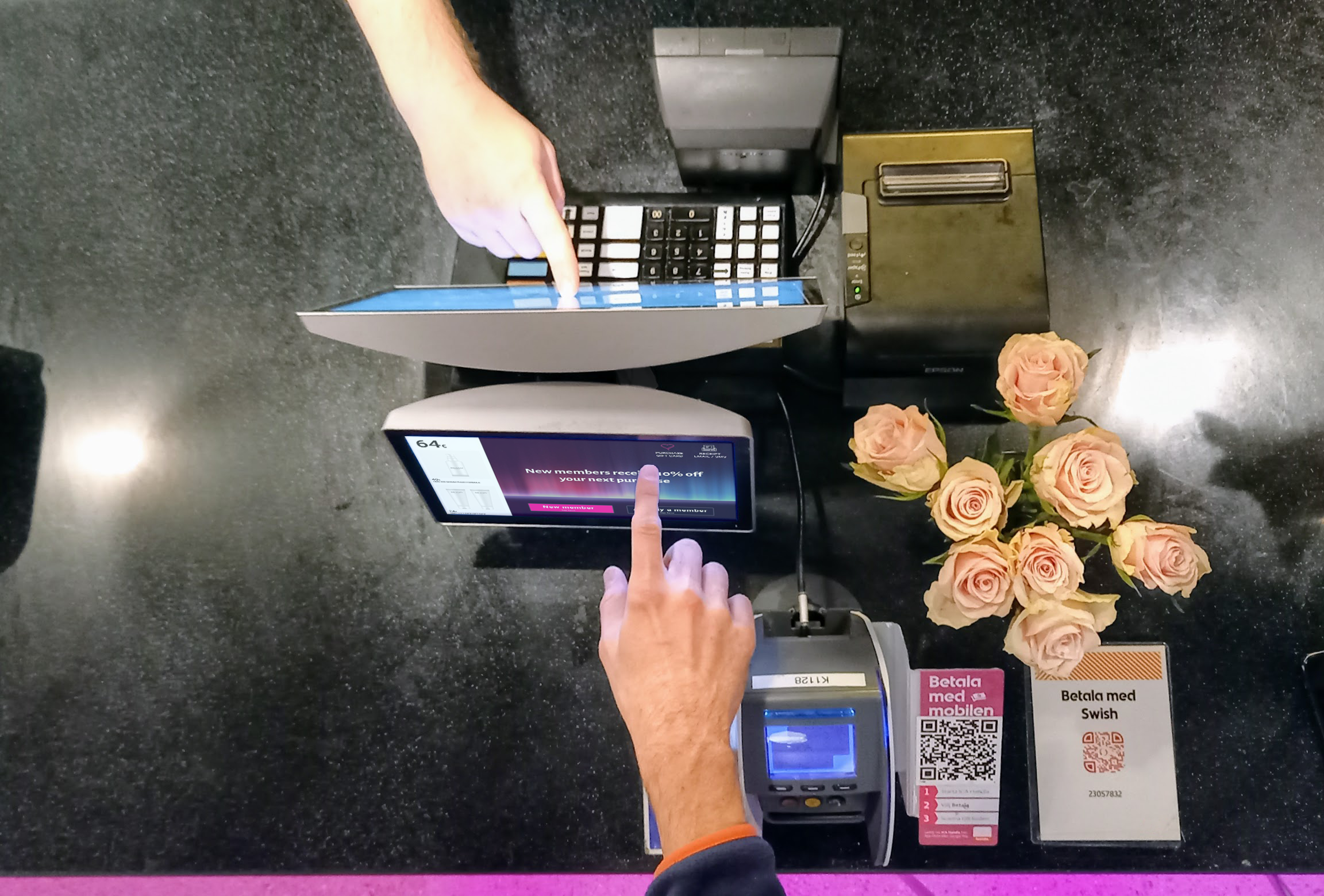
Dual input on two touch monitors simultaneously

Dual input or dual point user input are common terms describing the 'multiple touch input on two devices simultaneously' challenge.

When there are touch input commands from two touch monitors simultaneously this will require a technical solution to function. This is because some operating systems only allow one cursor to work. When there are two users, like in the picture example, the two simultaneous dual input actions would require two “cursors” in the operating system to function. If one of the users also has a mouse connected to their display there is a risk that the second user would interrupt the first user by moving the mouse cursor. In this example the second display user would normally interfere with the main screen user.

These technical solutions can for example be observed in patent applications in the dual input field.

End consumers sometimes need help and assistance to get this setup working with two touch monitors.

There are dedicated companies working with dual input solutions to other enterprise companies for example ID24 second displays. Another B2B example which required a technical solution was two 55" LCD TV's each with their own IR touch overlay. This required additional help to solve the dual input on two screens simultaneously.

Finally we also see web technology frameworks adding dual input support. One example is Smart client which released support for dual input in their software v. 12.

== See also ==
- Multi-monitor
- Touchscreen
