= NComputing =

Virtualization software company

NComputing, Inc.
- Type: Private
- Founded: 2003
- Headquarters: San Mateo, California, USA
- Key people: Young Song (CEO)
- Number of employees: Approximately 120
- Website: www.ncomputing.com

NComputing is a desktop virtualization company that manufactures hardware and software to create virtual desktops (sometimes called zero clients or thin clients) which enable multiple users to simultaneously share a single operating system instance.

NComputing, based in San Mateo, California, is a privately held for-profit company with offices in the United States, Singapore, UK, Germany, India, Korea, and Poland; and resellers around the world.

== History ==
=== Founding ===
In 2003, Young Song, a former VP at eMachines, met German entrepreneur Klaus Maier (formerly CEO of hydrapark), who had spent more than ten years developing the core software on which NComputing is based. They formed a team to develop the complementary hardware in Korea, while the software was written in Poland and Russia. After they successfully launched the product and reached $10 million revenue in two years, the two founders decided to move its headquarters to Silicon Valley. Stephen Dukker, former chairman of eMachines, joined NComputing in August 2006, to lead the company together.

=== Financing ===
Dukker introduced NComputing to venture capitalists and technology journalists in September 2006 at DEMOfall 06. By October 2006, NComputing had raised $8 million from Scale Venture Partners (formerly known as BA Venture Partners). In January 2008, the company raised a $28 million series B round of financing, led by Silicon Valley venture capital firm Menlo Ventures with participation from Scale Venture Partners and South Korea's Daehong Technew Corp. In April 2012, the company raised a $21.8 million series C round of financing led by Questmark Partners with participation from existing investors. In 2017, original NComputing Co., Ltd, a Korean corporation, became the ultimate holding company for all other subsidiaries and had raised $6 million from MDI VC (Telkom Indonesia VC in Jakarta), Pinnacle Ventures (Menlo Park, United States), and Bokwang Ventrues (Seoul, Korea) for accelerating South Asia region's growth and boost enterprise VDI software products.

=== Current growth ===
The company was founded in 2003. Current global usage is 20 million daily users in 140 countries. Typical customer profile includes 70,000 education and business organizations including 5,000 school districts in the United States. NComputing has shipped more than three million units overall, including 180,000 seats to provide one computing seat for every K–12 student in the country of North Macedonia. As of 2017, the company has 100 employees worldwide.

According to several survey metrics, Ncomputing is positioned as one of the top five major players in the enterprise thin client market - next to Dell, Hewlett-Packard, Lenovo, and IGEL.

== Operating system and virtualization support ==
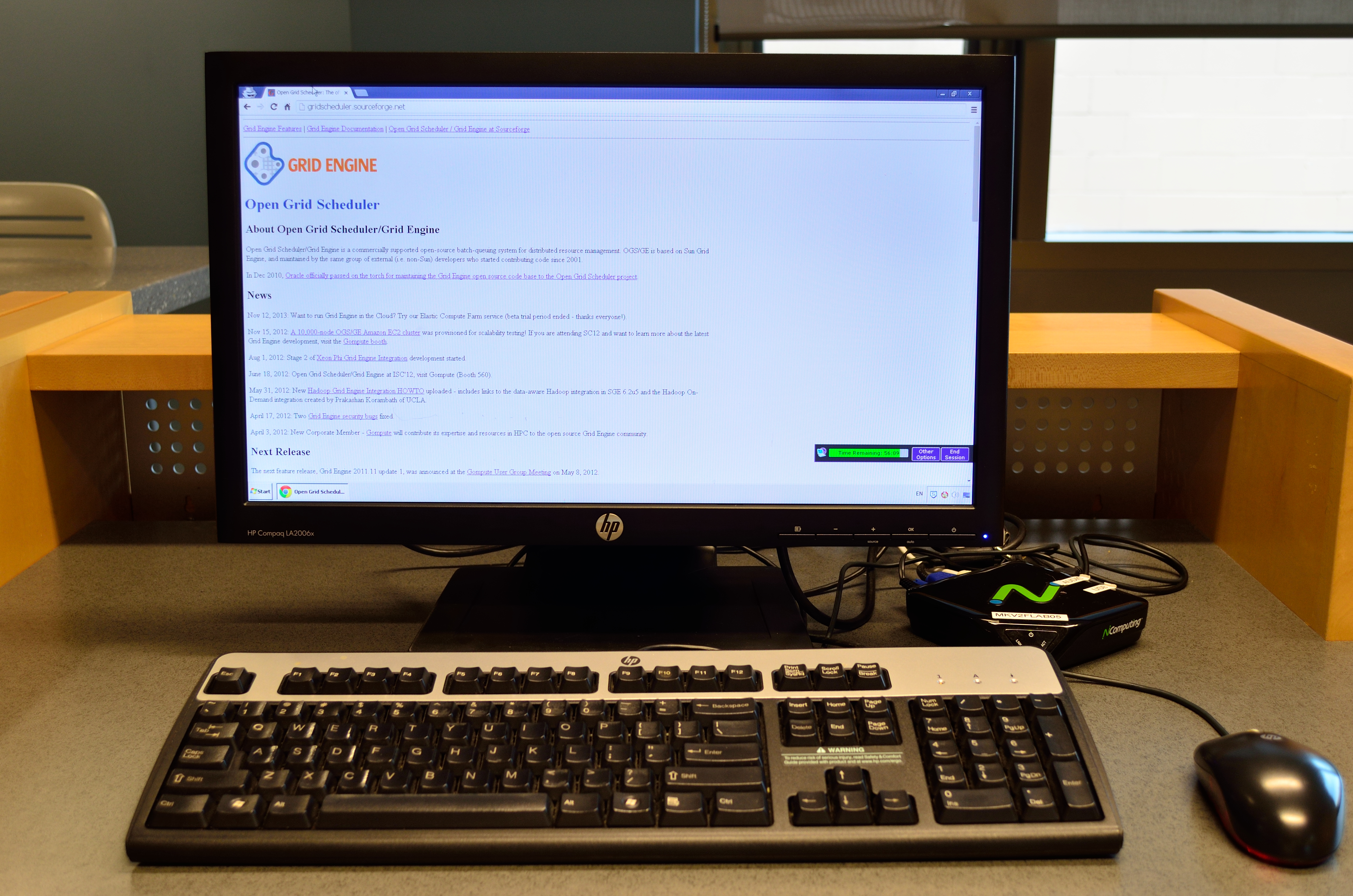
An NComputing thin client running Windows

=== Linux support ===
Linux is supported through a version of vSpace Server for Linux software. Currently, NComputing offers support for Ubuntu 14.04, 16.04 and 18.04. This software is proprietary and requires a server-based license. There is a 10-day free trial period. The vSpace Server for Linux provides features like client session monitoring, virtual IP, optimized video playback and messaging service between the clients.

=== Windows support ===
Windows is supported through a version of vSpace Server for Windows software. The supported versions of Windows include: Windows Server 2003 R2 SP2, Windows XP SP3 (32-bit); Windows Server 2008 SP2, Windows Vista SP21(32-bit); Windows Server 2008 R2 SP1, Windows MultiPoint Server 2011, Windows 7 SP1 (both 32- and 64-bit), Windows 8 SP1 (64-bit), Windows Server 2012 R2, Windows 10, Windows Server 2016 and Windows Server 2019.،vSpace Server software utilizes Microsoft Remote Desktop Services features to host user sessions.

== See also ==
=== VDI support ===
NComputing's VERDE VDI Enterprise Edition 8.x product provides a virtualization solution based on Virtual Desktop Infrastructure. NComputing acquired VERDE VDI intellectual property rights from Virtual Bridges in Q1 2017 and officially launched the product in June 2017. It runs on KVM enabled Linux OS baremetal or nested KVM enabled Azure or Google Cloud. Current version 8.3.4 supports 10 languages.

== See also ==
- Multiseat configuration
- Windows MultiPoint
