= Windows SteadyState =

Discontinued network configuration software produced by Microsoft (2005-08)

- Windows SteadyState 2.5 running on Windows XP
- Developer: Microsoft
- Release: 2005; 21 years ago
- Final release: 2.5 / July 2, 2008; 18 years ago
- Operating system: Windows XP and Windows Vista
- Platform: Strictly IA-32
- Type: System software
- License: Freeware
- Website: www.microsoft.com/windows/products/winfamily/sharedaccess/default.mspx

Version history
- 1.0: Released in 2005 as Shared Computer Toolkit
- 2.0: Released in June 2007; supports Windows XP SP2 Home, Professional and Tablet PC editions
- 2.5: Released in July 2008; adds support for Windows Vista SP1 and Windows XP SP3

Windows SteadyState (formerly Shared Computer Toolkit) is a discontinued freeware tool developed by Microsoft that gives administrators enhanced options for configuring shared computers, such as hard drive protection and advanced user management. It is primarily designed for use on computers shared by many people, such as internet cafes, schools and libraries.

Introduced in 2005, SteadyState was available until December 31, 2010, from Microsoft for 32-bit versions of Windows XP (Service Pack 2 and above) and Windows Vista. It is incompatible with Windows 7 and later. A similar disk protection component was included in Windows MultiPoint Server 2012.

== Features ==
SteadyState can revert a computer to a previously stored state every time it reboots, or on administrator's request. When Windows Disk Protection (WDP) component of SteadyState is turned on, changes to the hard disk are redirected to a temporary cache. WDP offers three modes of protection:

- Discard mode: The cache is cleared upon every reboot, thus returning the system to its previous state.
- Persist mode: Changes saved in the cache remain intact across reboots. An administrator may later opt to commit these changes. Alternatively, at the specified date and time, the cache expires and its contents are cleared.
- Commit mode: Contents of the cache is written out to disk and become permanent. In addition, new changes to the system are no longer redirected to the cache.

SteadyState can prepare user environments. User accounts can be locked or forced to log off after certain intervals. A locked account uses a temporary copy of the user's profile during the user's session. When the user logs off, the temporary profile is deleted. This ensures that any changes the user made during their session are not permanent.

SteadyState provides simple control of more than 80 restrictions covering both individual users as well as the system as a whole. Many of these settings are based on Windows Group Policies, while others are implemented by SteadyState itself. Using SteadyState, an administrator can forbid a user from performing actions that may be undesirable for that environment. Some settings include the ability to turn off the control panel, disable Windows Registry editing tools that come with Windows, disable Windows Command Prompt and stop the users from executing batch files or programs outside pre-approved folders.

Computer settings can also be applied. Since SteadyState would normally remove any Windows updates or security patches installed, SteadyState can be configured to check for and apply updates in a manner that they will not be removed upon rebooting. Administrators can also choose to make other system-wide changes, such as disabling the welcome screen, removing the shutdown dialog from the logon screen, and hiding the built-in Windows Administrator account.

The administrator can block access to specified programs on a per-user basis. SteadyState presents a list of programs found in the Program Files directory of Windows and on the common desktop. Programs from other locations can be added manually.

== Discontinuation ==
Microsoft has discontinued SteadyState. As of December 31, 2010, it is no longer available for download. Support was available until June 30, 2011, through the Microsoft Support website. Microsoft claims it is still possible to prepare a shared computer using native features of Windows 7 such as System Restore. To that effect, Microsoft has published Creating a Steady State by Using Microsoft Technologies [sic] on TechNet Library. However, this document does not introduce a replacement for the WDP.

Windows 8.1 added a new feature called Assigned Access which restricts the Windows device to a running a predetermined Metro-style app.
