= Multi-monitor =

Use of multiple physical display devices

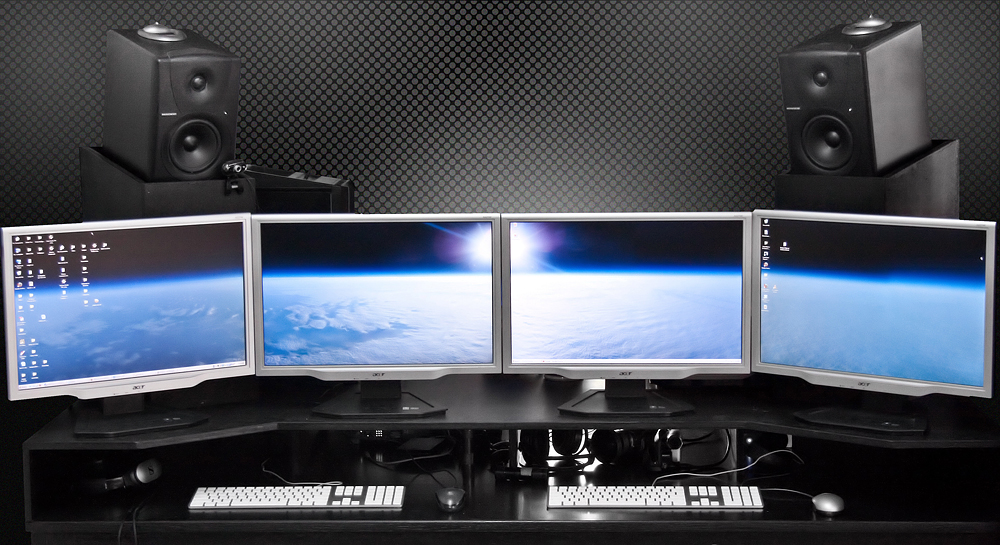
Two dual-monitor digital audio workstations

Multi-monitor, also called multi-display and multi-head, is the use of multiple physical display devices, such as monitors, televisions, and projectors, in order to increase the area available for computer programs running on a single computer system. Research studies show that, depending on the type of work, multi-head may increase the productivity by between 50 and 70 percent.

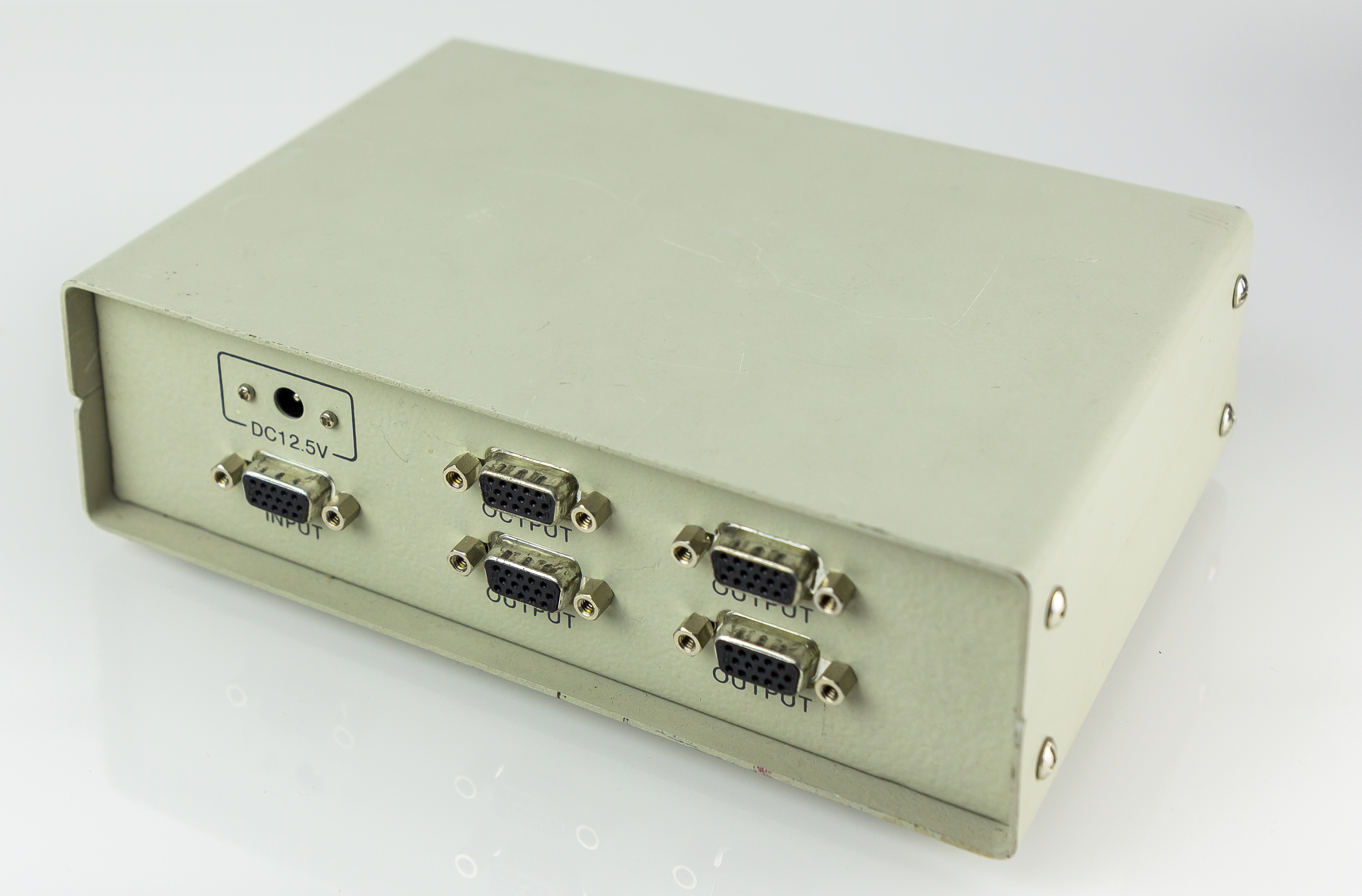
Analog Monitor Splitter for VGA cable

One way to extend the number of displays on one computer is to add displays via USB. Starting in 2006, DisplayLink released several chips for USB support on VGA/DVI/LVDS and other interfaces. Multiple computers can be connected to provide a single display, e.g. over Gigabit Ethernet/Ethernet to drive a large video wall, or multiple monitors can be connected to a single graphics card, with multiple video ports.

== Studies and safety ==
Measurements of the Institute for Occupational Safety and Health of the German Social Accident Insurance showed that the quality and quantity of worker performance varies according to the screen setup and type of task. Overall, the results of physiological studies and the preferences of the test persons favour a dual-monitor rather than single-monitor setup. Physiologically limiting factors observed during work on dual monitors were minor and not generally significant. There is no evidence that office work with dual-monitor setups presents a possible hazard to workers.

== Adoption ==
=== In the office ===
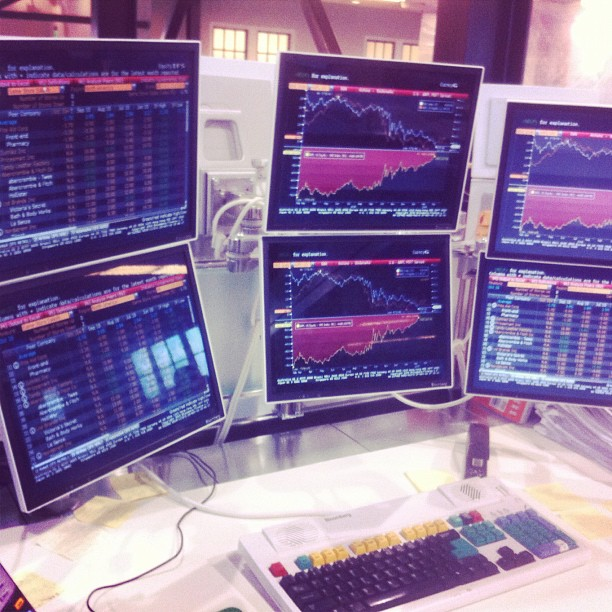
A Bloomberg Terminal

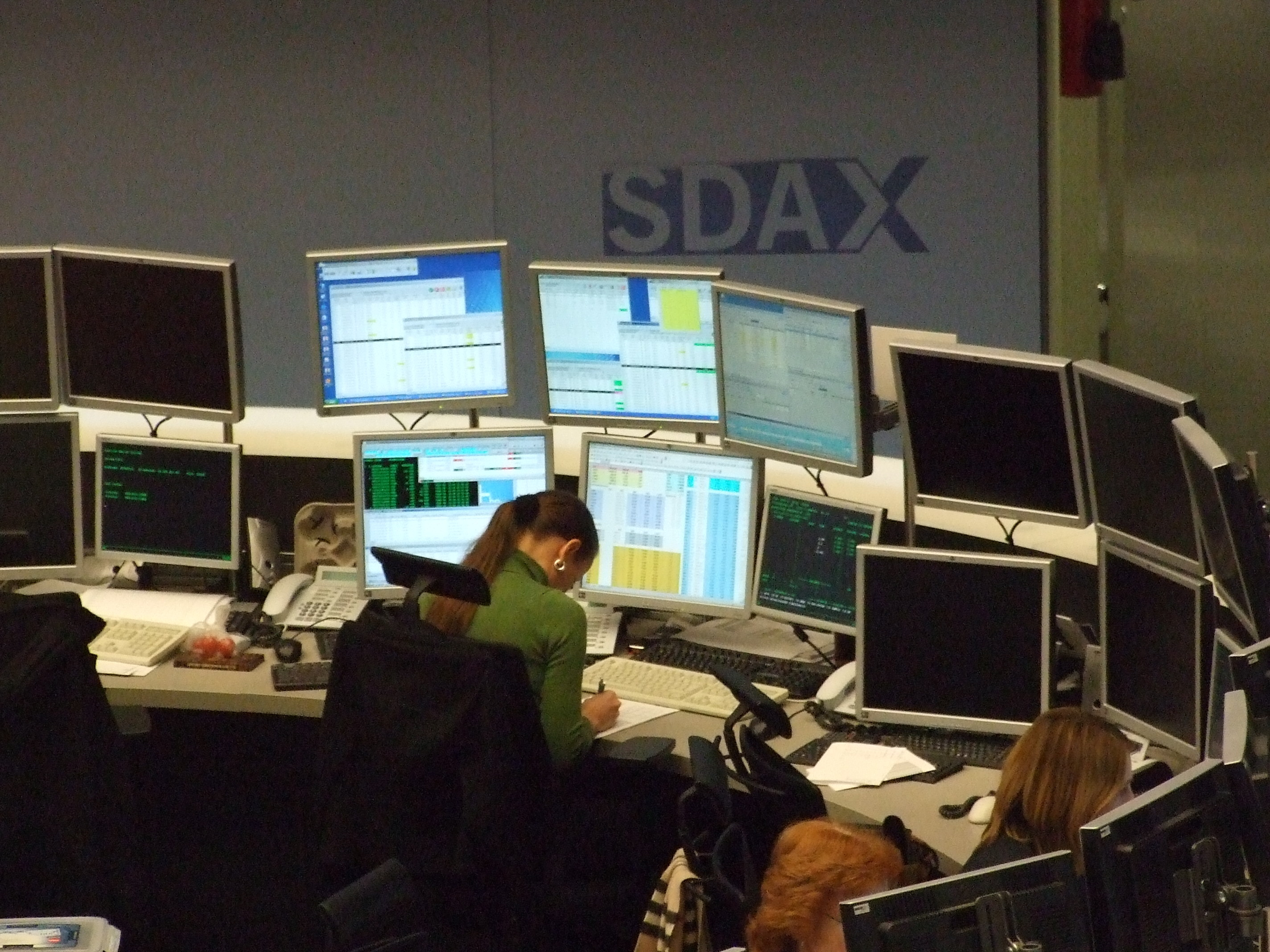
Multi-monitor setups in financial market making

In many professions, including graphic design, architecture, communications, accounting, engineering and video editing, the idea of two or more monitors being driven from one machine is not a new one. While in the past, it has meant multiple graphics adapters and specialized software, it was common for engineers to have at least two, if not more, displays to enhance productivity.

==== Vertical monitor ====
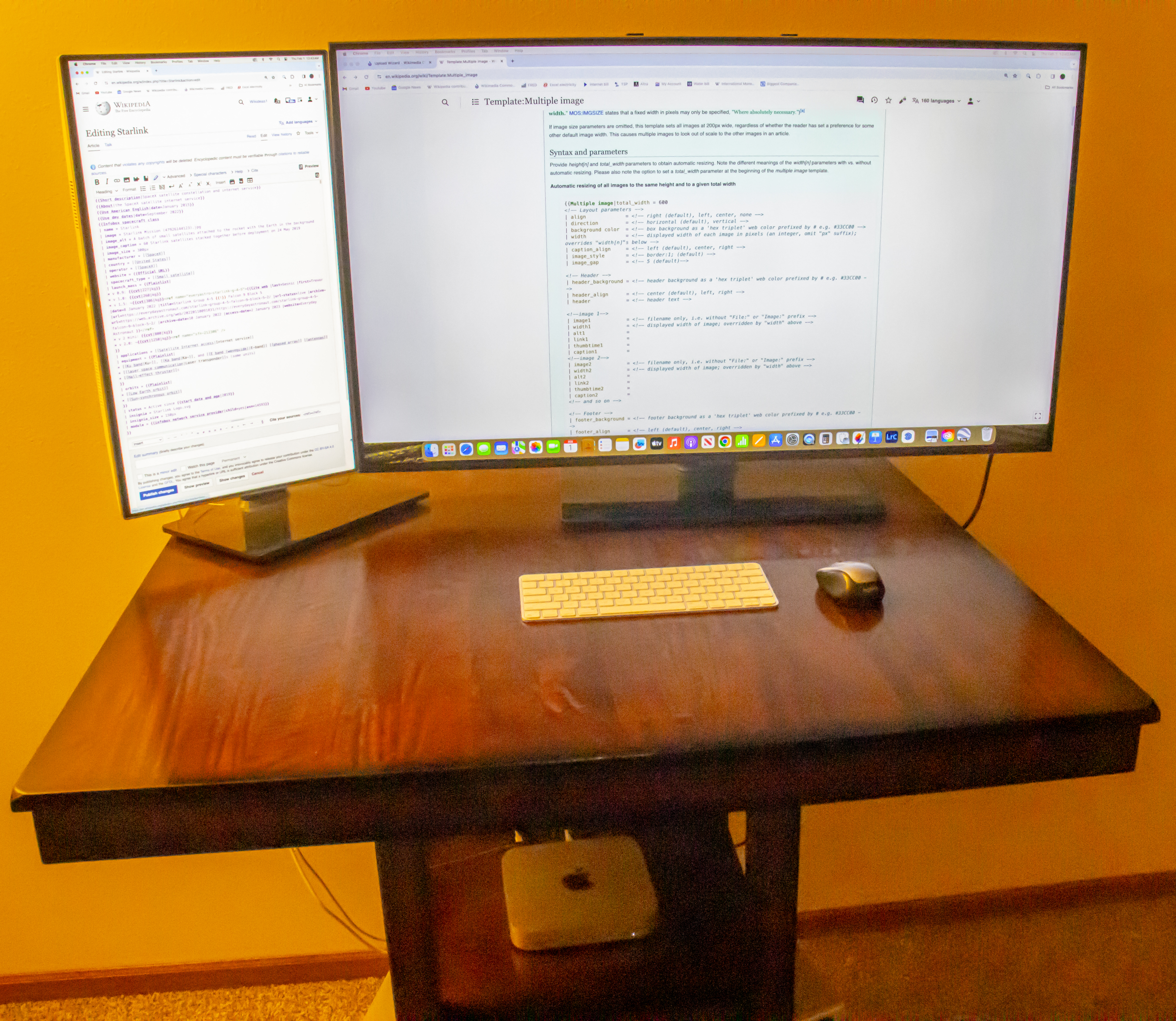
Vertical monitor second display to the left

Vertical monitors are usually added as a secondary display to the left or right of the main landscape oriented monitor. They are useful to display more information, as in lists, vertically down the page. Computer programmers use this configuration most often to see as many lines of code on the screen as possible without having to scroll a lot.

=== In video gaming ===
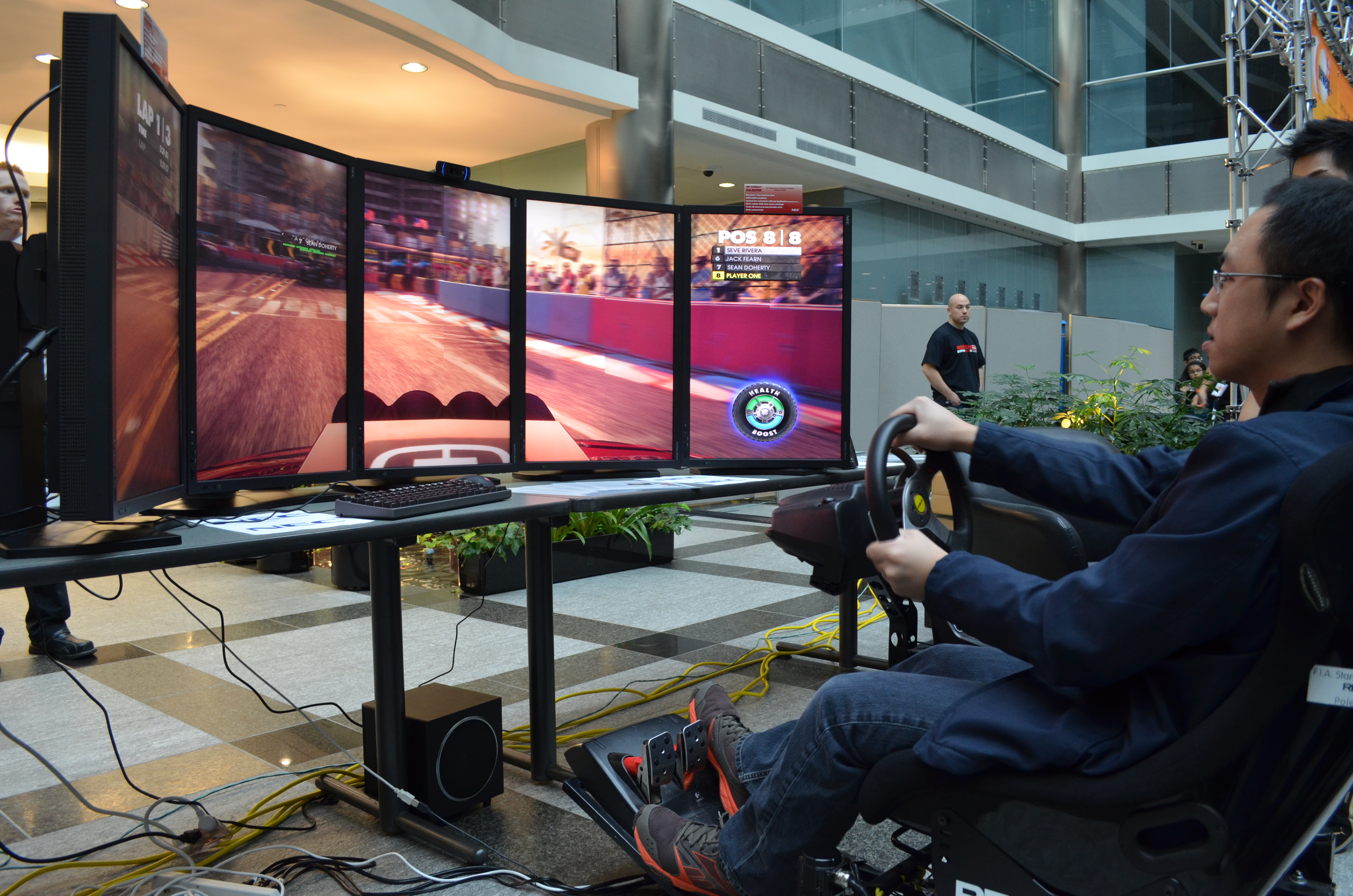
AMD Eyefinity-driven multi-monitor system for gaming

Early versions of the 1993 first-person shooter Doom permitted a three-monitor display mode, using three networked machines to show left, right, and center views.

More recently, games have used multiple monitors to show a more absorbing or immersive interface to the player or to display game information. Various flight simulators can use these monitor setups to create an artificial cockpit with more realistic interfaces. Others such as Supreme Commander and World in Conflict can use an additional monitor for a large scale map of the battlefield.

A large number of older games support multi-monitor set-ups by treating the total screen space as effectively a single monitor to the game, a technique known as spanning. Many games without inherent multi-monitor support such as Guild Wars and World of Warcraft can also be made to run in multi-monitor set-ups, with this technique or in conjunction with addition of third-party software A larger list of games that support dual/multi-screen modes is available at WSGF.

==== Arcade machines and handheld console games ====
The concept of "multi-monitor" games is not limited to games that can be played on personal computers. As arcade technology entered the 1990s, larger cabinets were being built which in turn also housed larger monitors such as the 3 28" screen version of Namco's Ridge Racer from 1993. Although large screen technology such as CRT rear projection was beginning to be used more often, multi-monitor games were still occasionally released, such as Sega's F355 Challenge from 1999 which again used 3 28" monitors for the sit-down cockpit version. The most recent use of a multi-monitor setup in arcades occurred with Taito's Dariusburst: Another Chronicle game, released in Japan in December 2010 and worldwide the following year. It uses 2 32" LCD screens and an angled mirror to create a seamless widescreen.

Nintendo demonstrated the feasibility of playing multi-monitor games on handheld game consoles in designing the Nintendo DS and its successor, the Nintendo 3DS, which both became successful consoles in their own right. Games on these systems take advantage of the two screens available, typically by displaying gameplay on the upper screen, while showing useful information on the bottom screen. There are also a number of games, mostly for the Nintendo DS, whose gameplay spans across both screens, combining them into one tall screen for a more unique and larger view of the action.

== Developing software for multiple monitor workstations ==
Ordinary software does not need special support for multiple screens even if it uses the graphic accelerator. At the usual application level, multihead is presented just as a single larger monitor spanning over all screens. However, some special approaches may increase the multithread performance.

With multiple monitors present, each screen will have its own graphics buffer. One possible scenario for programming is to present to OpenGL or DirectX a continuous, virtual frame buffer in which the OS or graphics driver writes out to each individual buffer. With some graphics cards, it's possible to enable a mode called "horizontal span" which accomplishes this. The OpenGL/DirectX programmer then renders to a very large frame buffer for output. In practice, and with recent cards, this mode is being phased out because it does not make very good use of GPU parallelism and does not support arbitrary arrangements of monitors (they must all be horizontal). A more recent technique uses the wglShareLists feature of OpenGL to share data across multiple GPUs, and then render to each individual monitor's frame buffer.

=== In Android ===
Android supports an additional monitor as of version 4.2 but additional software is needed to multi-task/use both at once.

== Second displays ==
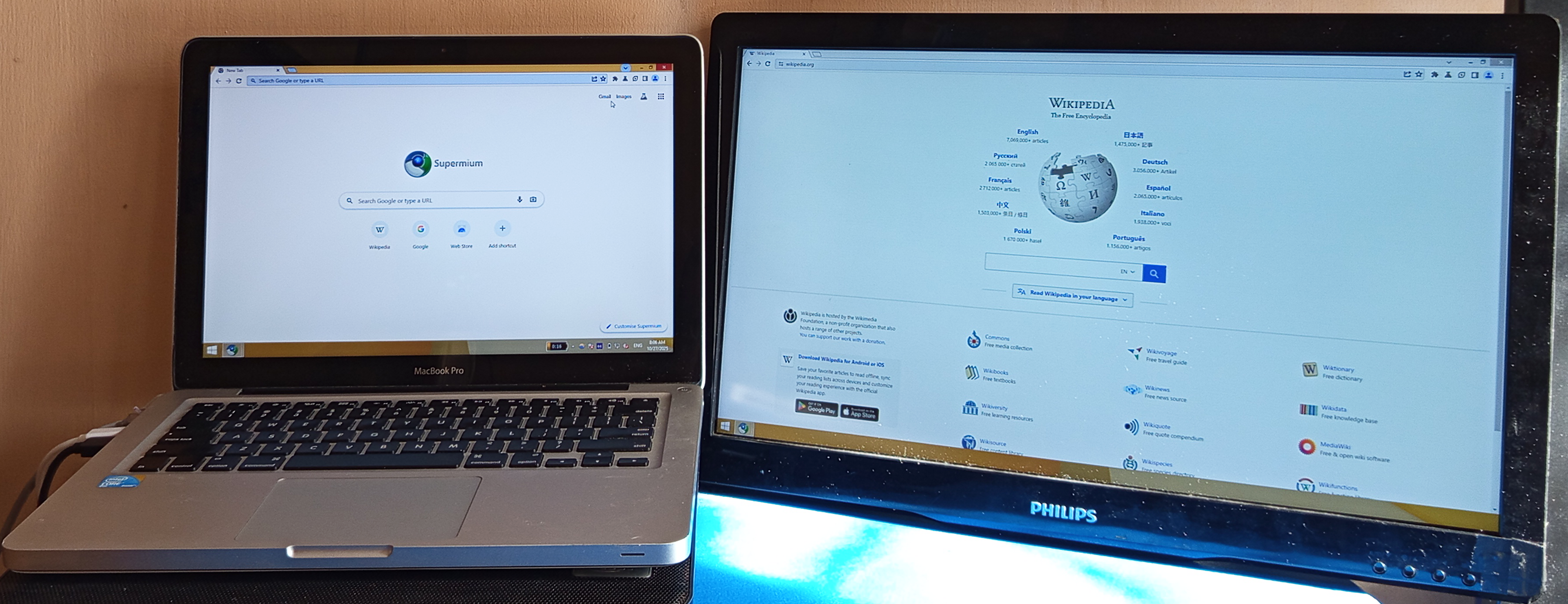
Laptop with a second display

A second display or second displays is a common term describing the multi-monitor setup with just one additional monitor attached. Today it is particularly common to have one workstation with two monitors connected where the second monitor is referred to as the second display. Many laptops have an HDMI port to drive an external monitor, and many tablets will serve as a second display connected to a laptop. Many modern shops use cash registers with two screens, one facing the cashier and a second display facing the shopper.

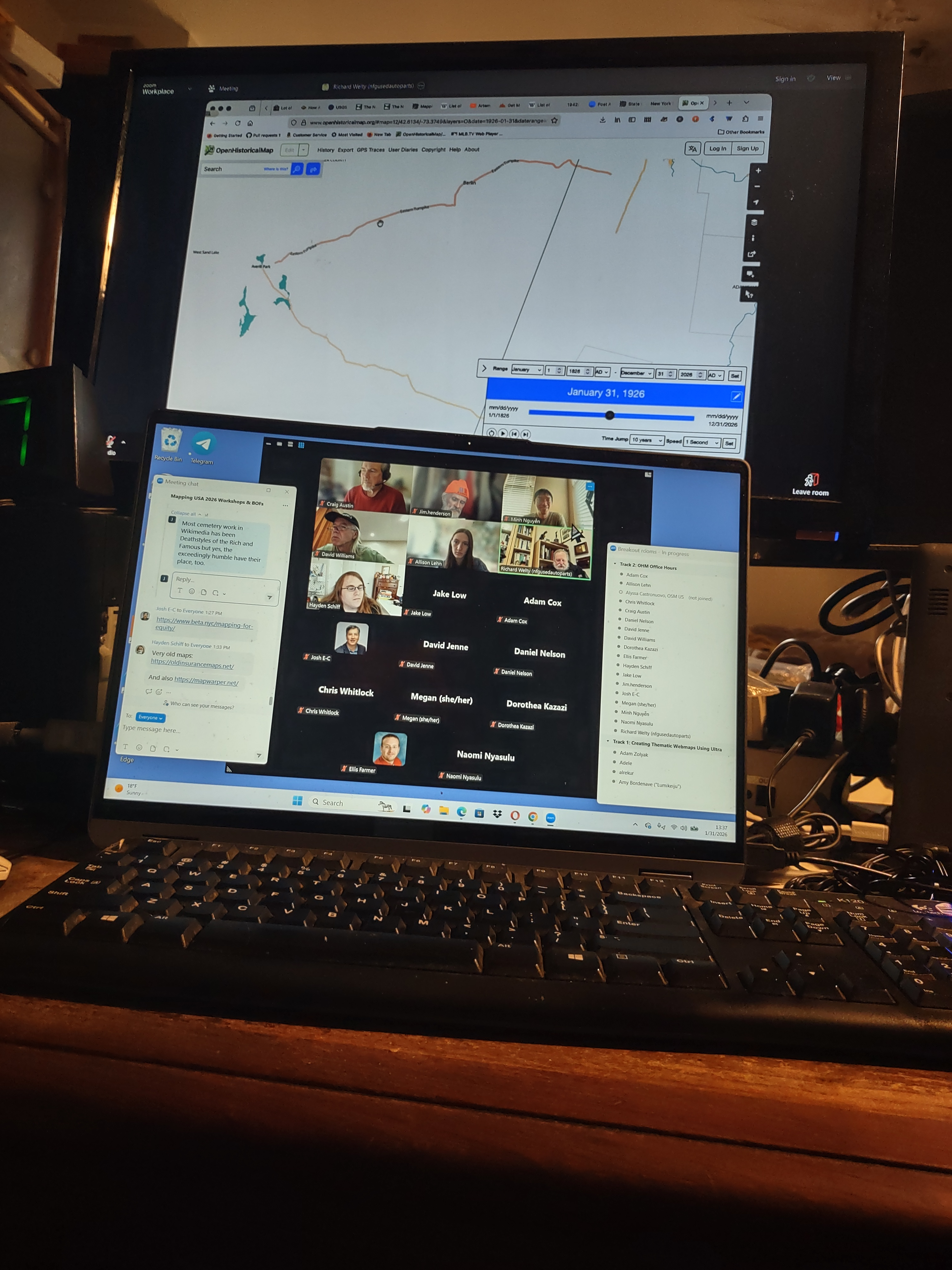
Laptop with external keyboard and second screen showing different parts of the same teleconference

Today's second display has evolved from a multi screen personal computer monitor to having multiple technical features such as a touchscreen, web cam or even a barcode reader in stores. Simultaneous touch inputs will call for a technical solution for the dual input.

The European Union Intellectual Property Office rejected a trademark application for "second display" by LG Electronics, citing that the term was not distinctive.

=== Professional meaning ===
Shop and IT-support staff can use the term “second display” when referring to the second monitor in a multi-monitor setup.

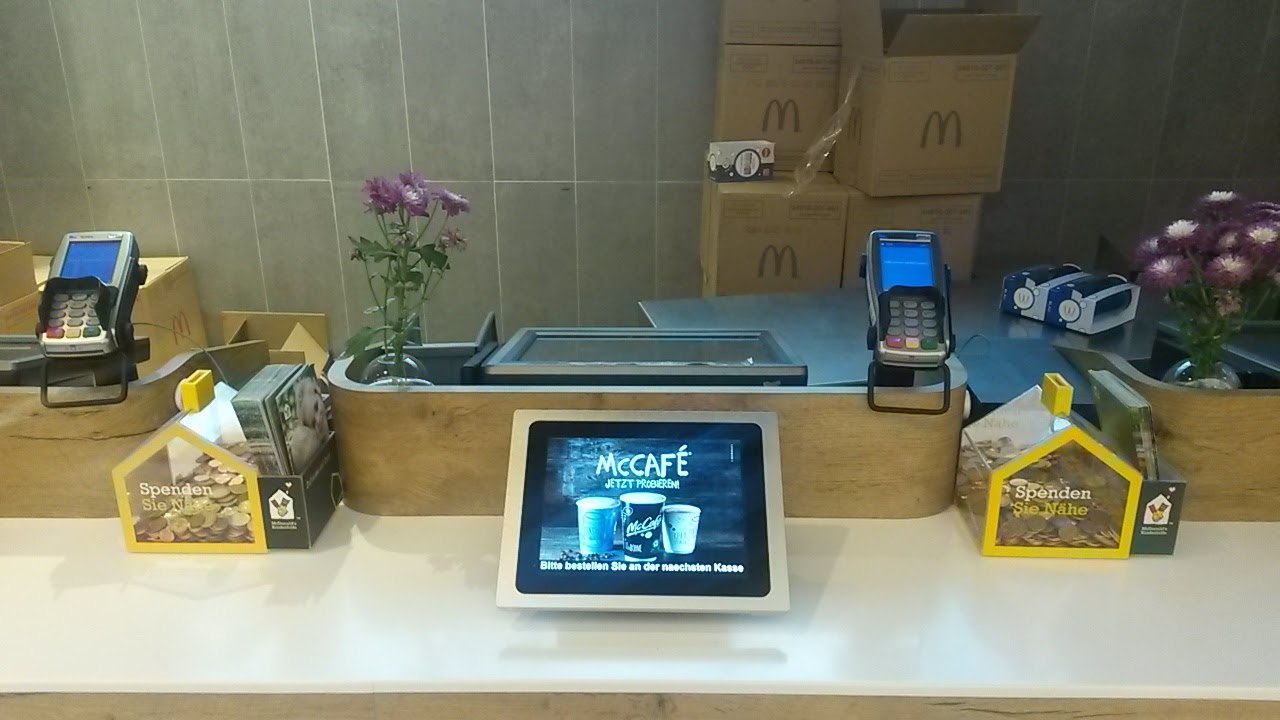
Second display in use at a Point of Sale (POS) at McCafé

Retail and hotel businesses have a professional meaning for a "second display", also known as interactive customer display or dual-screen for shops. The term is used in retail and hotel environments when referring to a customer facing display that is connected to the point of sale (POS) system. Normally a second display solution contains both hardware and interactive software allowing the shopper to perform certain actions. The second display is most commonly used to show the total purchase amount and the purchase list. Some advanced systems contain functionality relating to loyalty and member data. In an article from 2021 the Swedish retail magazine Dagens Handel mentions the provider of second displays ID24 and their published survey among retail and hospitality companies.

The second display can draw shoppers' attention to new products, advertisements, charities, or special offers. The displays can also be used for different kinds of user input – for example entering an email to receive an electronic receipt, give feedback or sign up for loyalty to the customer relationship management (CRM) system.

== See also ==
- Dual-touchscreen
- Multiseat configuration
- Video wall
