= DisplayLink =

American semiconductor and software technology company

DisplayLink Corp.
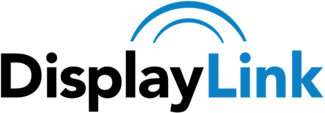
- Type: Private
- Industry: Semiconductors
- Founded: 2003; 23 years ago
- Founder: Dr. Quentin Stafford-Fraser, Martin King
- Defunct: July 2020; 6 years ago
- Fate: Acquired by Synaptics
- Headquarters: Palo Alto, California, US
- Area served: Worldwide
- Products: USB Graphics chips
- Number of employees: 160 (2016)
- Website: displaylink.com

DisplayLink Corp. (formerly Newnham Research) was a semiconductor and software technology company. It specialized in developing DisplayLink USB graphics technology. This technology enables connections between computers and displays via USB, Ethernet, and WiFi. Additionally, it supports the connection of multiple displays to a single computer. DisplayLink products are currently developed by Synaptics, Inc., who acquired DisplayLink Corp. in 2020.

DisplayLink served various customers, including notebook OEMs, LCD monitor manufacturers, and PC accessory vendors. Its technology is compatible with operating systems such as Microsoft Windows, macOS, Android, ChromeOS, and Linux.

DisplayLink operated globally with offices in the United States, the United Kingdom, Poland, and Taiwan. The company was privately funded and by 2013, had raised $75 million in financing from venture capital organizations Atlas Venture, Balderton Capital, Cipio Partners, DAG Ventures and DFJ Esprit.

In July 2020, DisplayLink was acquired by Synaptics, who has since assumed research and development of DisplayLink products.

== Company history ==
DisplayLink was founded in 2003 as Newnham Research by Dr. Quentin Stafford-Fraser and Martin King. The Newnham Research team invented NIVO (Network In, Video Out) designed for low-cost thin-client computing over Ethernet networks. The company referred to these thin-client computers as network displays.

In 2006, Newnham Research launched its first commercially available product in partnership with the Kensington Computer Products Group: a USB 2.0 universal laptop docking station designed for the retail market.

In November 2006, Newnham Research renamed itself to DisplayLink, a name that allegedly better described its display connection technology. The name is very similar to the DisplayPort display interface, which was approved by VESA earlier that year.

DisplayLink launched its first semiconductor product family, the DL-120 and DL-160 USB 2.0 graphics devices, in January 2007, signaling a change in the company's business plan from FPGA-based systems to semiconductors. The DL-120 and DL-160 allow up to six additional monitors to be added to a PC through USB 2.0.

In May 2009, DisplayLink launched its second semiconductor product family, the DL-125, DL-165, and DL-195 USB 2.0 graphics devices. This DL-1x5 family brought improved performance, an increase in maximum resolution to 2048x1152, and the integration of a DVI transmitter and video DAC. The first products to ship with the new DL-1x5 chips were the Samsung Lapfit LD190G and LD220G monitors.

On November 17, 2009, DisplayLink announced its first Thin Client product based on its USB 2.0 virtual graphics technology, designed for Microsoft Windows MultiPoint Server. Thin client manufacturer HP was the first to announce a product based on DisplayLink USB Graphics technology with the launch of the t100 Thin Client.

At the Consumer Electronics Show (CES) in 2012, DisplayLink announced several products incorporating video and graphics over a USB 3.0 "SuperSpeed USB" connection, showing substantial improvements in performance, resolution support, and video quality.

At CES in 2013, DisplayLink demonstrated USB Power Delivery in which a standard USB cable is used to charge a laptop computer.

At CES in 2016, DisplayLink announced their latest docking chip, the DL-6000 series, to support dual 4Kp60 over USB 3.0.

At CES in 2017, DisplayLink demonstrated Wireless VR using DisplayLink graphics over a wireless 60 GHz link.

In July 2020, DisplayLink was sold to Synaptics.

== Technology ==
DisplayLink's network graphics technology consists of two main components:

- Virtual Graphics Card (VGC) software that is installed on a PC and;
- a Hardware Rendering Engine (HRE) embedded in or connected to a display device.

The DisplayLink VGC software is based on proprietary adaptive graphics technology. The VGC software runs on a Windows, macOS, or Linux host PC and takes information from the graphics adapter, compresses the changes to the display from the last update, and sends it over any standard network including USB, Wireless USB, Ethernet, and Wi-Fi.

After receiving the data, the HRE then transforms it back into pixels to be displayed on the monitor.

While basic network graphics technology can be used on a variety of network interfaces (Ethernet, and Wi-Fi), DisplayLink has to date only designed products around USB 2.0, USB 3.0, and Wireless USB connectivity.

Products with DisplayLink technology are supported on Windows 10, Windows 8, Windows 7, Windows Vista, Windows XP, macOS, Android, ChromeOS, and Ubuntu.

== IC Generations ==
=== DL-1x0 (2007) ===
The DL-1x0 series was the first generation of DisplayLink ICs, launched in January 2007. The family consisted of 2 products: DL-120 and DL-160, differentiated by the maximum resolution supported by the device. DL-120 is supported up to 1280x1024/1400x1050 and DL-160 up to 1600x1200/1680x1050.

The ICs supported a USB 2.0 input and a 24-bit RGB output or LVDS output. Additional chips needed in the design are an EEPROM and DDR Memory. If the design required an Analog RGB (VGA) or DVI output an additional chip was needed to convert the 24-bit RGB output to VGA or DVI.

The DisplayLink website no longer shows the DL-1x0 ICs available, so they are presumed to be no longer available (as of February 2013).

=== DL-1x5 (2009) ===
The DL-1x5 series was introduced in May 2009. The family consists of 4 products: DL-115, DL-125, DL-165, and DL-195, again differentiated by the maximum resolution supported by the device. Features of the DL-1x5 family are:

- Integrated DVI, VGA, TTL, and LVDS (FPI)
- Dual-core design (DL-195/DL-165)
- Maximum resolution supported: 2048 x 1152
- Integrated USB 2.0
- DisplayLink DL 2+ Compression

=== DL-3xxx (2011) ===
The DL-3x00 series was first demonstrated at IDF in September 2011. It supports dual video outputs (DL-3900 and DL-3950) and integrated 5.1 audio and Gigabit Ethernet. It also integrated a new compression scheme, called DL3.0, and content protection using HDCP 2.0 encryption.

The DL-3xxx IC won the Best of CES Innovations 2011 Design and Engineering Award Honoree.

=== DL-41xx (2013) ===
The DL-41xx series came out in 2013. It is a USB 3.0 to LVDS device, supporting DL3 compression and HDCP 2.0 encryption. It is designed to be embedded into monitors to enable USB as a video input on displays. It is described as a low-power device, which enables it to be powered from the USB bus without the need for an external power supply. Power and video data can be delivered over a single cable.

The IC has been integrated into a number of portable USB displays from AOC, ASUS, and Taeseok.

=== DL-5xxx (2014) ===
The DL-5xxx series was the first USB 3.0 graphics chipset to support 4K UHD resolutions. The chipset was launched in 2014 at Interop.

=== DL-6xxx (2016) ===
The DL-6xxx series was announced at CES 2016. This version supports dual 4Kp60 displays over a USB 3.0 connection via a USB Type-C or USB Type-A connector.

== OS Support ==
DisplayLink technology does not install any hardware on the USB host device, therefore a driver must be installed. DisplayLink drivers for several operating systems are available.

There are unofficial reverse-engineered specifications available for older revisions of DisplayLink technology.

=== Microsoft Windows ===
The current DisplayLink drivers (June 2017) support Windows 7, Windows 8, Windows 8.1, and Windows 10. Support for Windows XP (32bit only) and Windows Vista is available with older DisplayLink driver versions.

There is no support for Windows RT versions.

=== Apple macOS ===
DisplayLink drivers are available for OS X 10.8 and later but newer DisplayLink chipsets require newer versions of the driver, which in turn require more recent macOS versions. DisplayLink confirmed that macOS versions 10.13.4 through 10.13.6 broke compatibility with their driver. DisplayLink is supported on macOS 10.14. macOS 10.13.4 introduced support for external graphics processors also known as eGPUs.

=== Android ===
An Android app was made available in the Google Play store, called DisplayLink Desktop, in May 2015, however, it is only available for Android 5.0 Lollipop, and later. However, in their website they have programs for Android. In their website they explain their Synaptics driver as:

"Enable any Android device to be a desktop workstation by installing this app and then connecting your Android device to a DisplayLink universal dock. This app will work with Android 5 (Lollipop) onwards.

Now you can use Microsoft Office, Google docs or any other productivity app on a desktop monitor with a keyboard and mouse."

=== Linux ===
The current generation of USB3 chips is supported by a binary-only driver on Ubuntu. The Linux kernel 3.4 also contains a basic DisplayLink driver.

A DisplayLink driver installer for Debian and Ubuntu-based Linux distributions (Elementary OS, Mint, Kali, Deepin, etc.) is available as part of the displaylink-debian project.

There was a DisplayLink-supported open source project called libdlo with the goal of bringing support to Linux and other platforms. As of November 2026, Synaptics has been making legal threats to Linux users who try to improve support.

=== Google ChromeOS ===
DisplayLink enabled devices can be used on ChromeOS from R51 onwards.

== Criticism ==
An independent review published in 2011 determined that at the time, DisplayLink use led to significantly higher CPU utilization compared to displays connected by native video interfaces.

Summer 2012 Mac OS X 10.8 problems were addressed by a new DisplayLink Mac driver announced at the 2013 Consumer Electronics Show. An article on DisplayLink's website said that minor issues under Mavericks (October 2013) and Yosemite (October 2014) were being resolved in collaboration with Apple.

Customers have also complained that DisplayLink USB3 video-certified technologies have falsely advertised support for Linux, or not stated that it is OS-dependent when running the Displaylink 3xxx/41xx chipset.

DisplayLink finally responded to this in August 2015 by releasing a binary driver for Ubuntu that supports all current USB 3.0 ICs. It is unclear if other Linux distributions will have DisplayLink support; however, details on how to port the driver to other distributions have been provided on the DisplayLink website.

In October 2026, Synaptics issued a cease-and-desist to the Vino project, an open source implementation of the DisplayLink protocol, causing its source code to be removed from GitHub.
