= Black Box Corporation =

American IT company

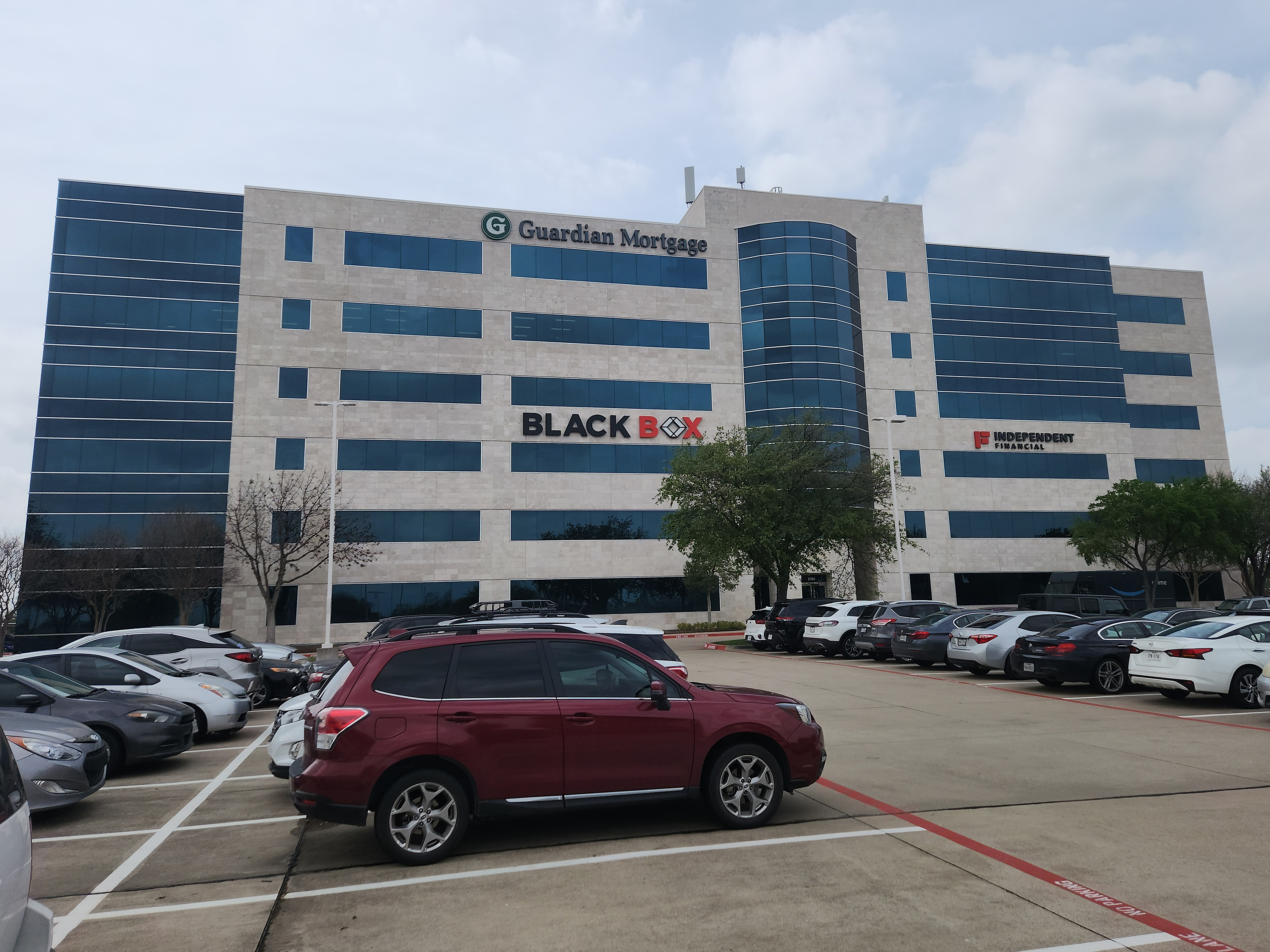
- Black Box Headquarters in Plano, Texas
- Type: Private
- Traded as: Nasdaq: BBOX
- Industry: Technology
- Founded: June 25, 1976; 50 years ago, in Lawrence, Pennsylvania
- Headquarters: Plano, Texas
- Area served: Worldwide
- Key people: Sanjeev Verma (CEO)
- Services: IT Services; 5G; Data Centers; Cyber Security; Unified communications KVM; Digital Signage; Network Management; Network Security; WAN Optimization
- Number of employees: 3800
- Parent: Essar Group
- Website: www.blackbox.com

Black Box Corporation is an IT company headquartered in Texas, United States. The company provides technology assistance and consulting services to businesses in a variety of sectors including retail, transportation, government, education, and public safety. Black Box operates in 75 locations across 35 countries. In 2022, Black Box had more than 3,800 employees worldwide.

== History ==
The company was founded in 1976 as Expandor Inc. by Eugene Yost and Richard Raub on Beatty Road in Monroeville, Pennsylvania. They soon moved to 1121 Sainte Claire Plaza, suite 300 in Upper Saint Claire Pennsylvania. The first Engineer was Tom McElroy, hired on Thanksgiving Day in 1978. In 1982, the company changed its name to Black Box Corporation and released its well-known Black Box Catalog.

Following a temporary dip in operations during Black Monday of 1987, Odyssey Partners bought the company through a leveraged buyout in 1988. In 1989, one of its divisions, “Interlan,” was sold to Racal.

=== 1990s ===
After suffering losses from debt servicing, Black Box Corporation underwent a restructuring in 1990. Its telecom product business was divided into a subsidiary called Micom Communications Corporation. Under the name MB Communications, an initial public offering was registered at NASDAQ in December 1992. Micom Communications unit was spun off and acquired by Northern Telecom (Nortel) in June 1996. Micom had money troubles and did some kind of share buy back in 1988. All the other companies were gone and BB was left. BB was then considered the parent company of Micom.

In May 1997, Black Box Corporation’s board of directors authorized management to buy back the company's stock, depending on market prices and other factors. In 1998, the company started offering on-site data and infrastructure services in the United Kingdom that further expanded throughout Europe and the Pacific Rim.

The profitable catalog sales business changed its name to Black Box Incorporated.

=== 2000s ===
From 2000 to 2010, Black Box Corporation formed partnerships in the USA with key IT service providers, including Cisco, Avaya, NEC, and Unify. There were about 120 acquisitions and mergers overall.

== AGC Networks ==
In Mumbai, AGC Networks Limited was established in 1986 under the name Tata Telecom Ltd., promoted by Tata Industries Ltd (TIL). Manufacturing electronic private automated branch exchanges (EPABX) was one of its main goals, and it also offered services like software integration, installation, commissioning, and service support.

With the Japanese company OKI Electric Industrial Co. Ltd. (OKI), Tata Industries Limited signed a technical assistance and license agreement as well as a supplemental agreement. The company established new service facilities in Guwahati, Nagpur, Pune, Jammu, and Baroda in 1990. With Japan Radio Co. Ltd. (JRC), the business signed a technology transfer and license agreement in 1991 for equipment with 30 and 120 digital UHF channels.

In order to create a new business called "Trans India Network Systems Private Limited," Tata Telecom and AT&T Network Systems International Inc. USA entered into a joint venture agreement in 1994. Its goal was to produce OPTIMUX and 2Mb/S systems, MAR systems, SLC 120 network access systems, and related modules.

As AT&T left, Tata Telecom and Avaya Systems established a joint venture in 1996. In India, Tata Telecom introduced a line of call centre products in 2000 that it had purchased from its joint venture partner Avaya Communications (formerly Lucent Technologies). Tata Telecom, the joint venture between Tata and Lucent Technologies, was known as a Tata-Avaya. Once the Tata Group sold its 25.1% ownership in Tata Telecom to its joint venture partner, Avaya Inc., the company Avaya Global Connect was created.

AGC Networks Limited was created in 2010 after Essar Group purchased Avaya Global Connect from Avaya Inc.

Transcend United Technologies, established in the US, was purchased by AGC Networks in 2011. Via this acquisition, AGC Networks widened its market reach to the States.

In 2015 AGC Networks acquired Ensource Business, providing services in healthcare vertical.

=== Rebranding ===
In 2019, Black Box Corporation was acquired by AGC Networks. In 2021, AGC Networks changed its name to Black Box.

== Awards ==
- TVB Europe Best of Show Award IBC 2022
- Disability Equality Index, 2022 Best Place to Work for Disability Inclusion
- CRN Five-Star Awards 2013

== Gallery ==
Africa
Kenya.

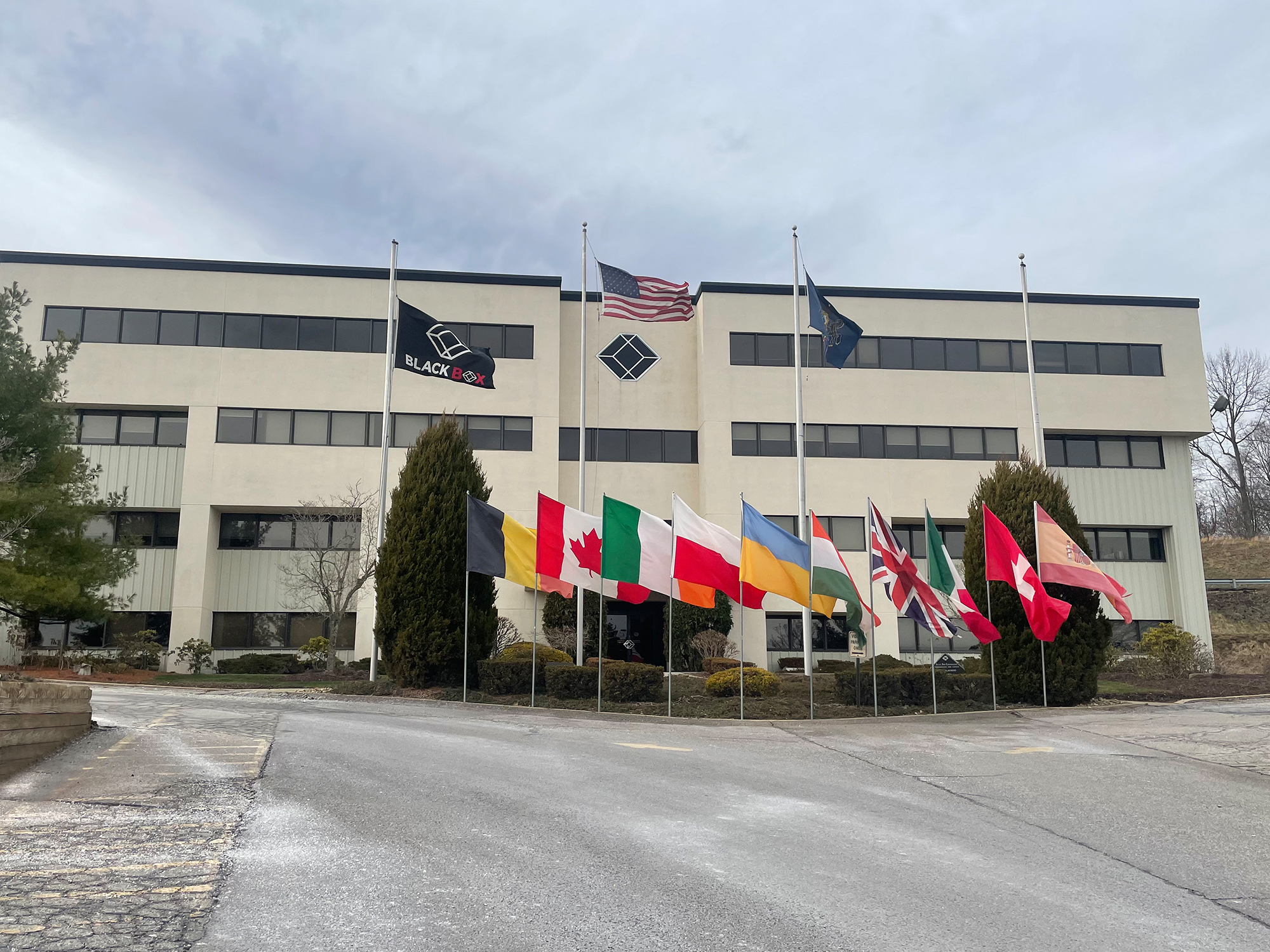
Black Box Corporation Building Lawrence, Pennsylvania, United States

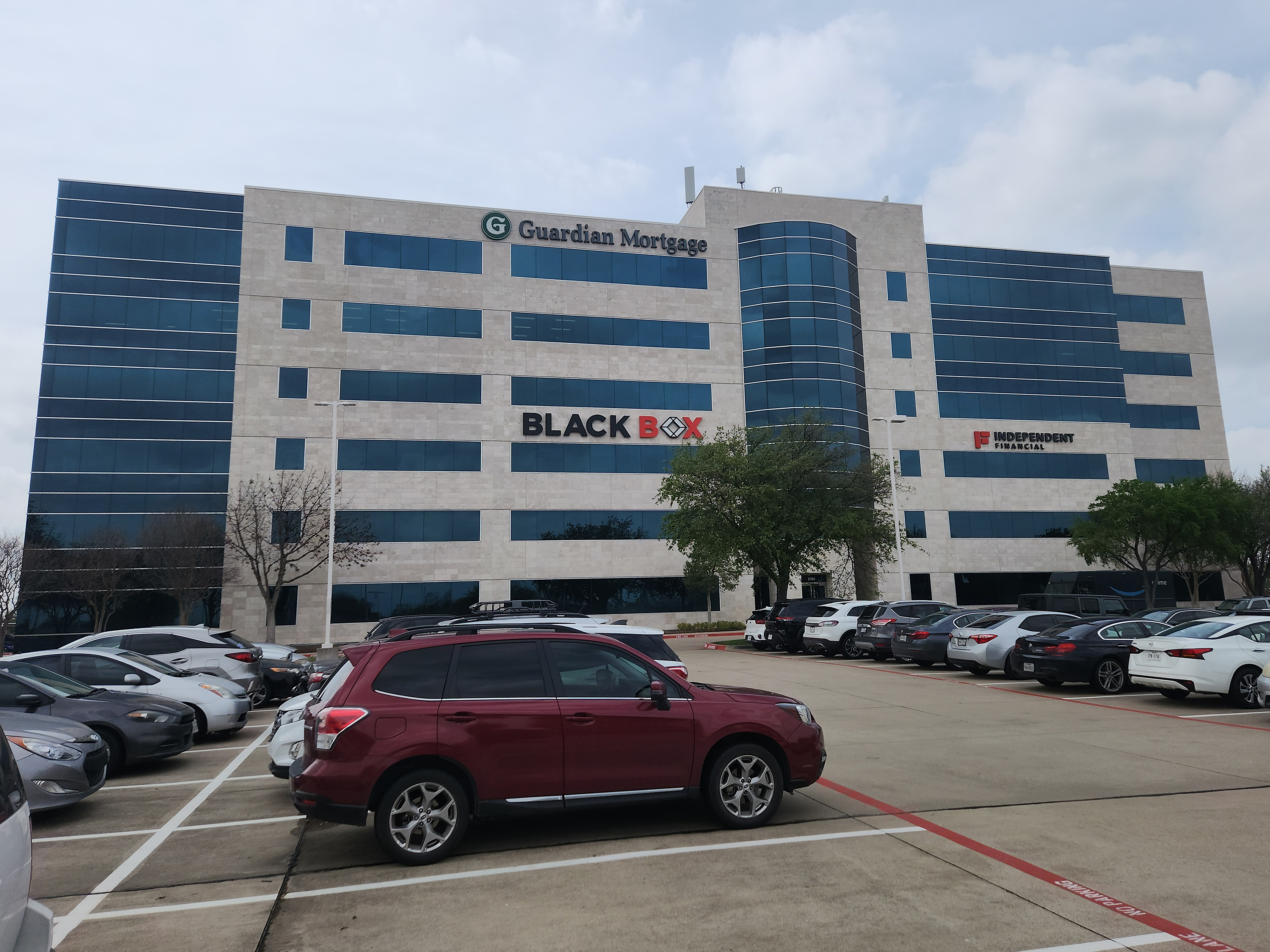
Black Box Building Plano, Texas, United States

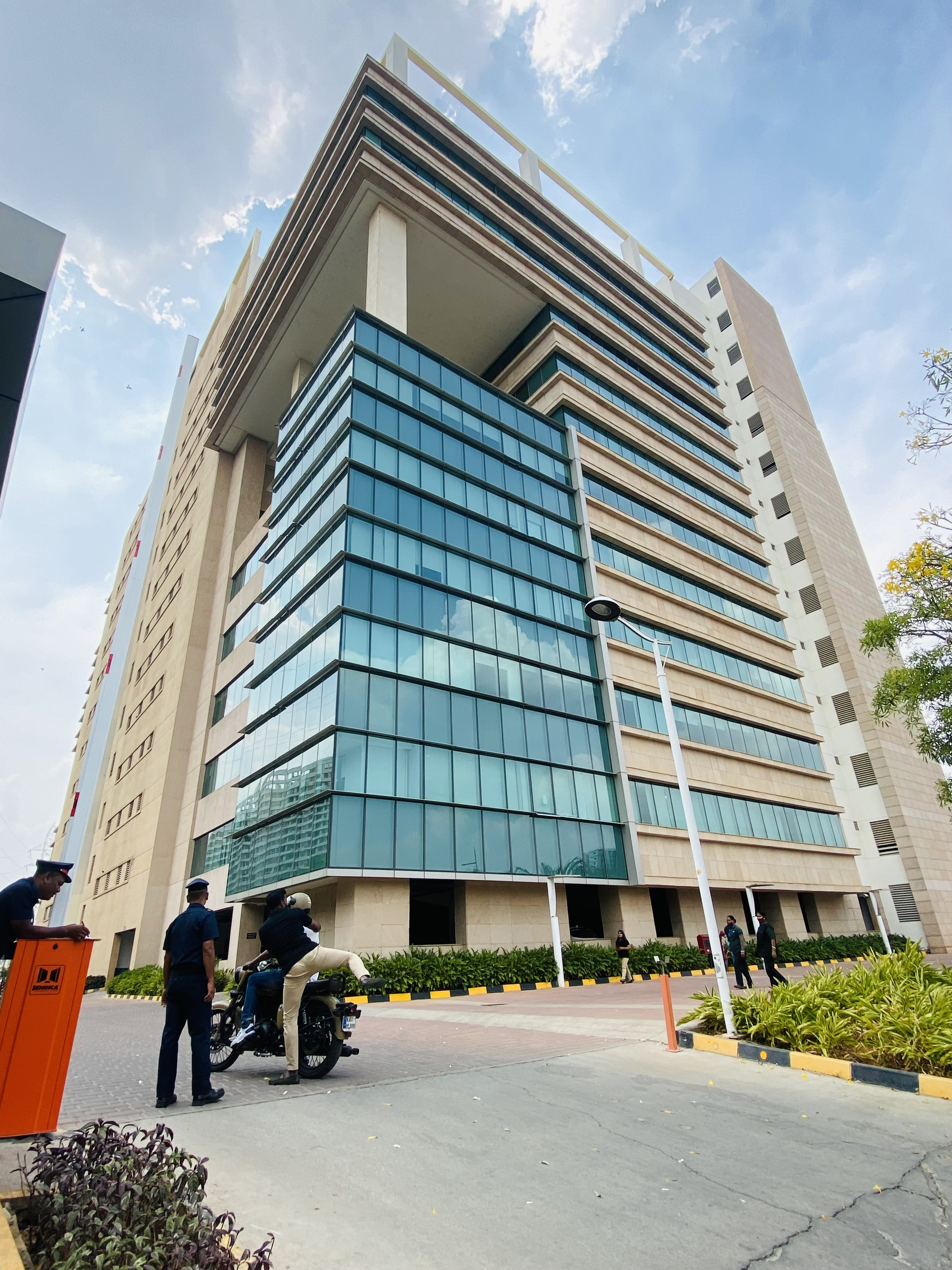
Black Box Building Bengaluru, India

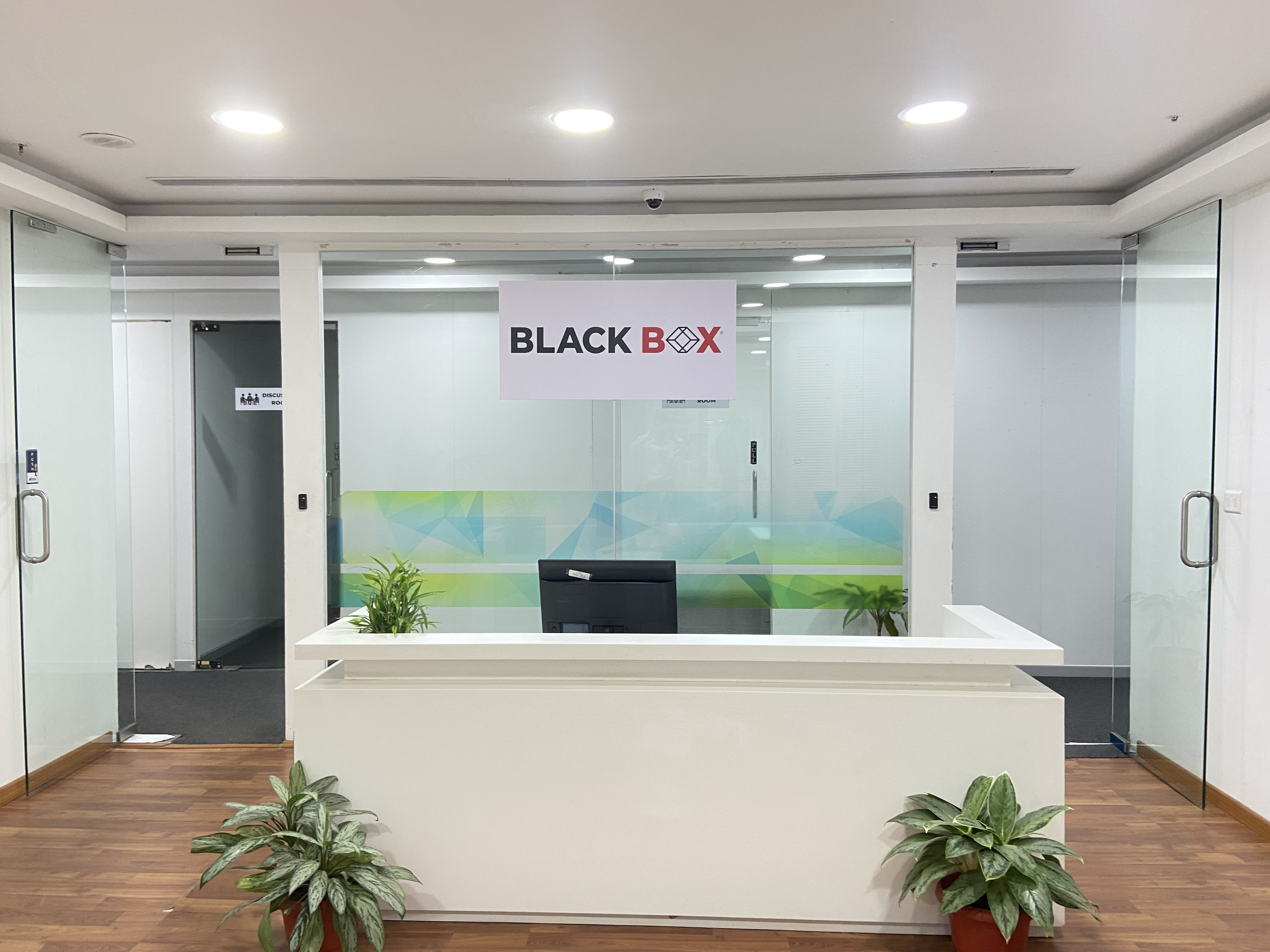
Black Box Reception Bengaluru, India

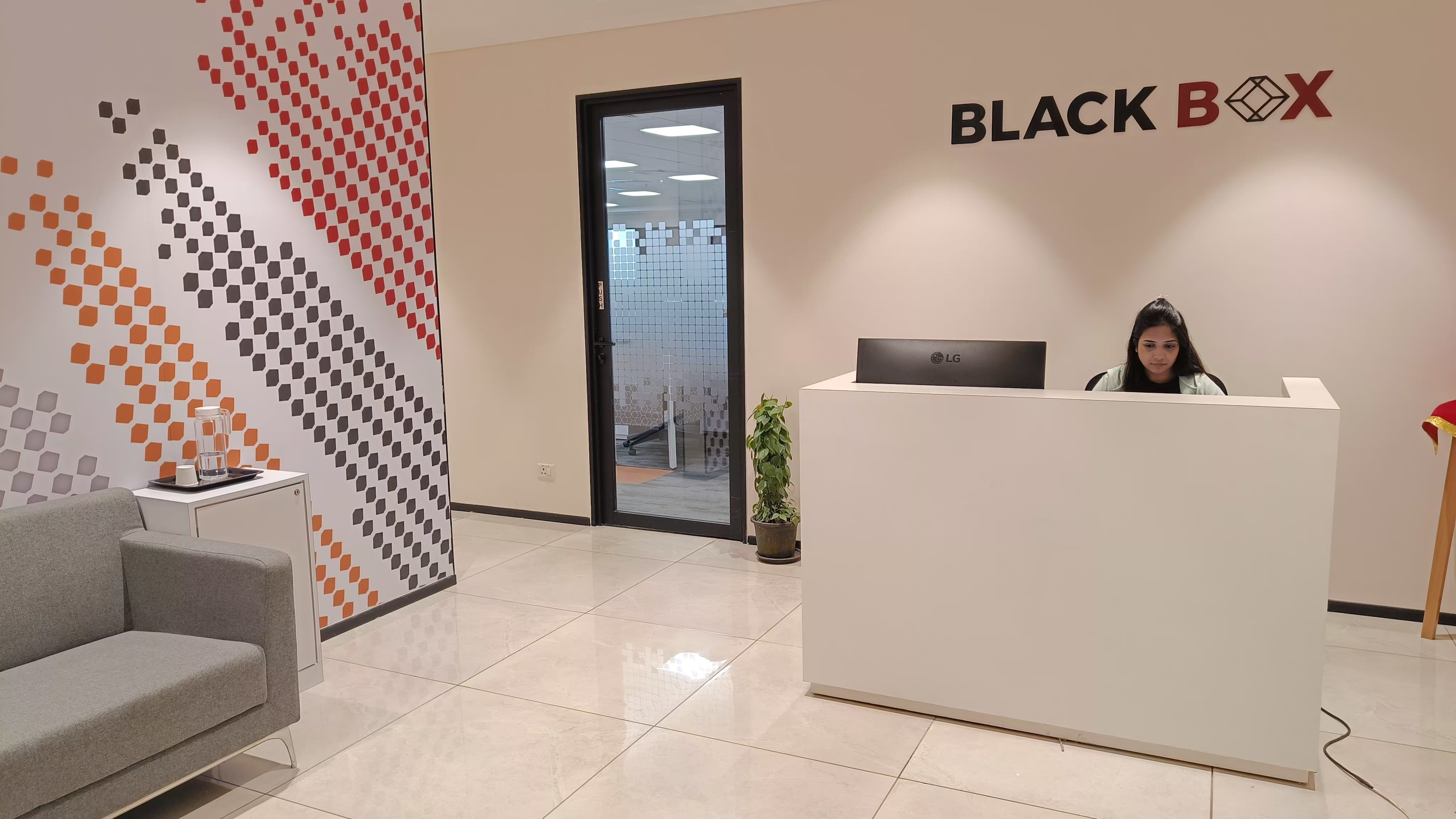
Black Box Reception Mumbai, India

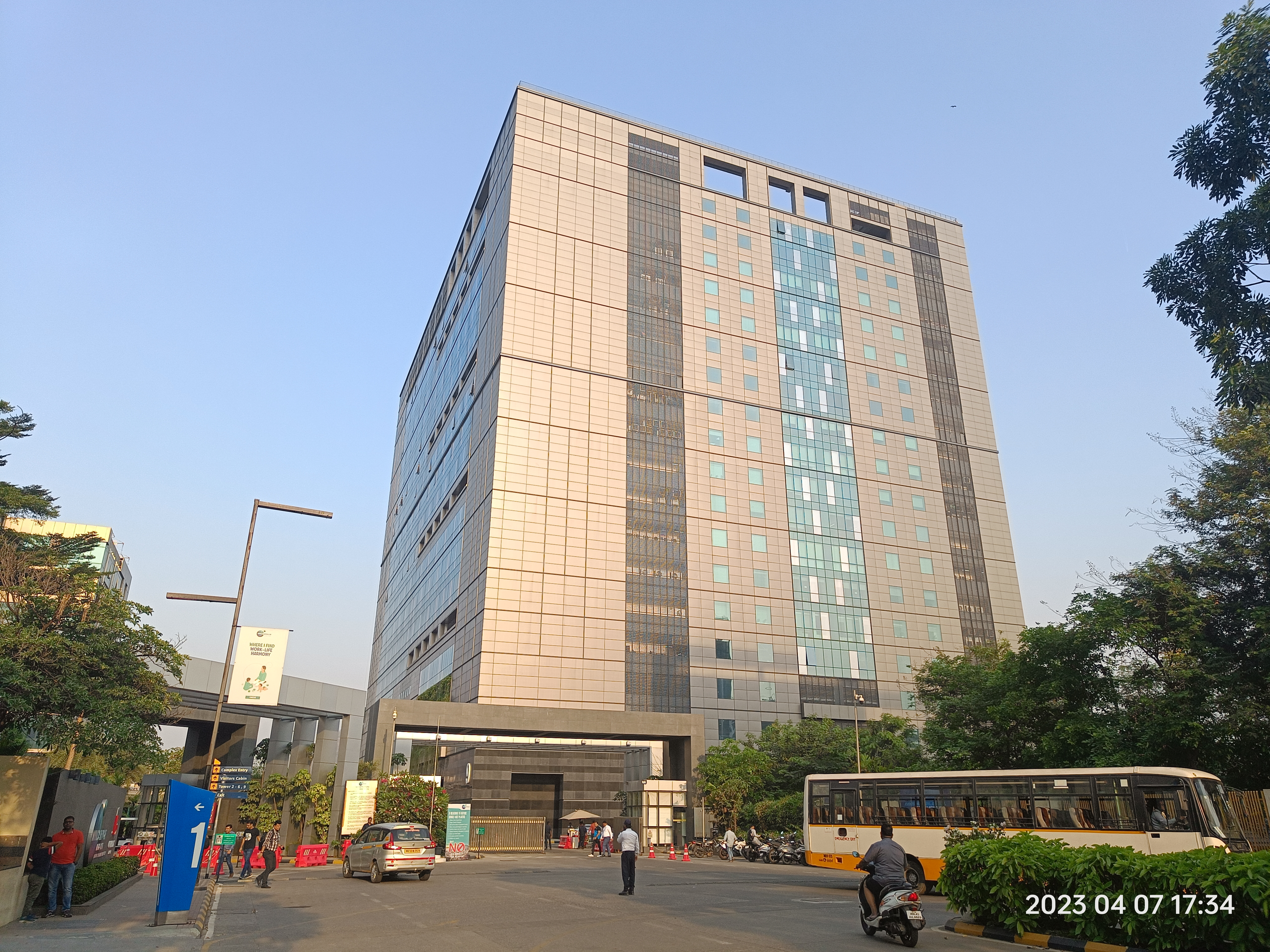
Black Box Building Mumbai, India
