= Windows MultiPoint Server =

Operating system based Microsoft Windows Server using Remote Desktop Services technology

- A screenshot of MultiPoint Server 2012 showing the MultiPoint Dashboard
- Developer: Microsoft
- Final release: 2012 (6.3.9600) / October 10, 2023; 2 years ago
- License: Proprietary commercial software
- Official website: Windows MultiPoint Server (archived at Wayback Machine)

Windows MultiPoint Server is an operating system based on Microsoft Windows Server using Remote Desktop Services technology to host multiple simultaneous independent computing stations or terminals connected to a single computer (multiseat computing). Windows MultiPoint Server 2012 was the final release as an independent SKU and has been superseded by the MultiPoint Services role in Windows Server 2016.

== Versions ==
=== Windows MultiPoint Server 2010 ===
This version was planned in January 2010 but was released in February 2010 a month later and is based on Windows Server 2008 R2. Its mainstream support ended on July 14, 2015, and extended support ended on July 14, 2020. Multiple stations can be added to a WMS 2010 host computer by connecting a single monitor, USB 2.0 hub, keyboard and mouse for each station. Hardware requirements for MultiPoint stations are non-proprietary, and virtually any multi-monitor video card, mouse, keyboard, monitor and some desktop Computers that is supported on all Windows and its Server "2008 R2" can be used to build a station.

Windows MultiPoint Server 2010 is available for purchase via either OEMs or academic volume licensing. The Academic version, acquired via Academic Volume Licensing, supports domain join and no licensing restrictions on station count (however, hardware limits still apply), but requires a Windows Server 2008 R2 client access license (CAL) and a Windows MultiPoint Server 2010 CAL per station, while the non-Academic version that is acquired via OEMs is limited to 10 stations maximum and does not support domain join, but only requires a Windows MultiPoint Server 2010 CAL per station and no Windows Server 2008 R2 CALs.

=== Windows MultiPoint Server 2011 ===
Windows MultiPoint Server 2011, based on Windows Server 2008 R2 SP1, was released to manufacturing on March 10, 2011. Its mainstream support ended on July 12, 2016 and extended support ended on July 13, 2021. New features in Windows MultiPoint Server 2011 include:

- The ability to add connect stations and thin clients over the LAN via traditional RDP clients
- Support for RemoteFX capable thin clients
- A shared management console extensibility with Windows Small Business Server 2011 and Windows Home Server 2011
- The ability to be backed up by Windows Small Business Server Essentials 2011 (the only server SKU that allows and supports this)
- Features that allow administrators to view and interact with thumbnails of station desktops, including
  - Projecting a single station's desktop to one or all stations
  - Locking the keyboard and mouse of station and displaying a message
  - Remotely opening and closing applications
  - Restricting internet browsing to a specific list of sites or blocking browsing to a specific list of sites
- Management of multiple WMS servers and stations from within a single administration console
- Support for running within a virtual machine
- Distribution through a wider variety of distribution channels for both editions

In addition, unlike Windows MultiPoint Server 2010, Windows MultiPoint Server 2011 is available in the Standard and Premium editions. The following table compares the two editions' differences; they share all other features equally.

	Standard	Premium	Notes
Maximum simultaneous stations (licensing limit)	10	20	Hardware limits still apply and Client Access Licenses are required (see below)
Maximum random-access memory (RAM)	8 GB	32 GB	Motherboard limitations still apply
Supported processor sockets	1	2	Only x86-64 sockets are supported.
Domain join	No	Yes	See also:Active Directory
Hyper-V support	No	Yes	"1 on 1" licensing model for the Premium edition.
Licensing	1 OS license per WMS instance, 1 WMS 2011 CAL per station, and for copies purchased through Volume Licensing, 1 Windows Server 2008 CAL per station as well.		All licenses are sold either via OEMs or Volume Licensing.

=== Windows MultiPoint Server 2012 ===
On 27 November 2012, Microsoft released Windows MultiPoint Server 2012 to manufacturing. Its mainstream support ended on October 9, 2018, and extended support ended October 10, 2023. This is the first version of MultiPoint to be based on Windows Server 2012, and contains several new features and upgrades from previous versions:

- The addition of the MultiPoint Dashboard, an application that allows specific non-administrator users to monitor and interact with user desktops
- The ability to create stations from virtual machines running on the WMS server (a feature only present on the Premium version).
- Disk protection, a server feature that discards changes made to the server during user sessions similar to Windows SteadyState
- Windows 8 desktop experience for users, including access to the Windows Store
- Monitoring client computers running Windows 7 or 8 with the MultiPoint Server Connector

=== MultiPoint Server role ===
With the release of Windows Server 2016, MultiPoint Server was added as a role, which allows it to be easily installed using tools like Server Manager. The MultiPoint Connector Services feature (which is also available in Server 2016) cannot be installed alongside the MultiPoint Services role.

== See also ==
- Multiseat configuration
- Microsoft Servers
- Windows Server
