= Cubic crystal system =

Crystallographic system where the unit cell is in the shape of a cube

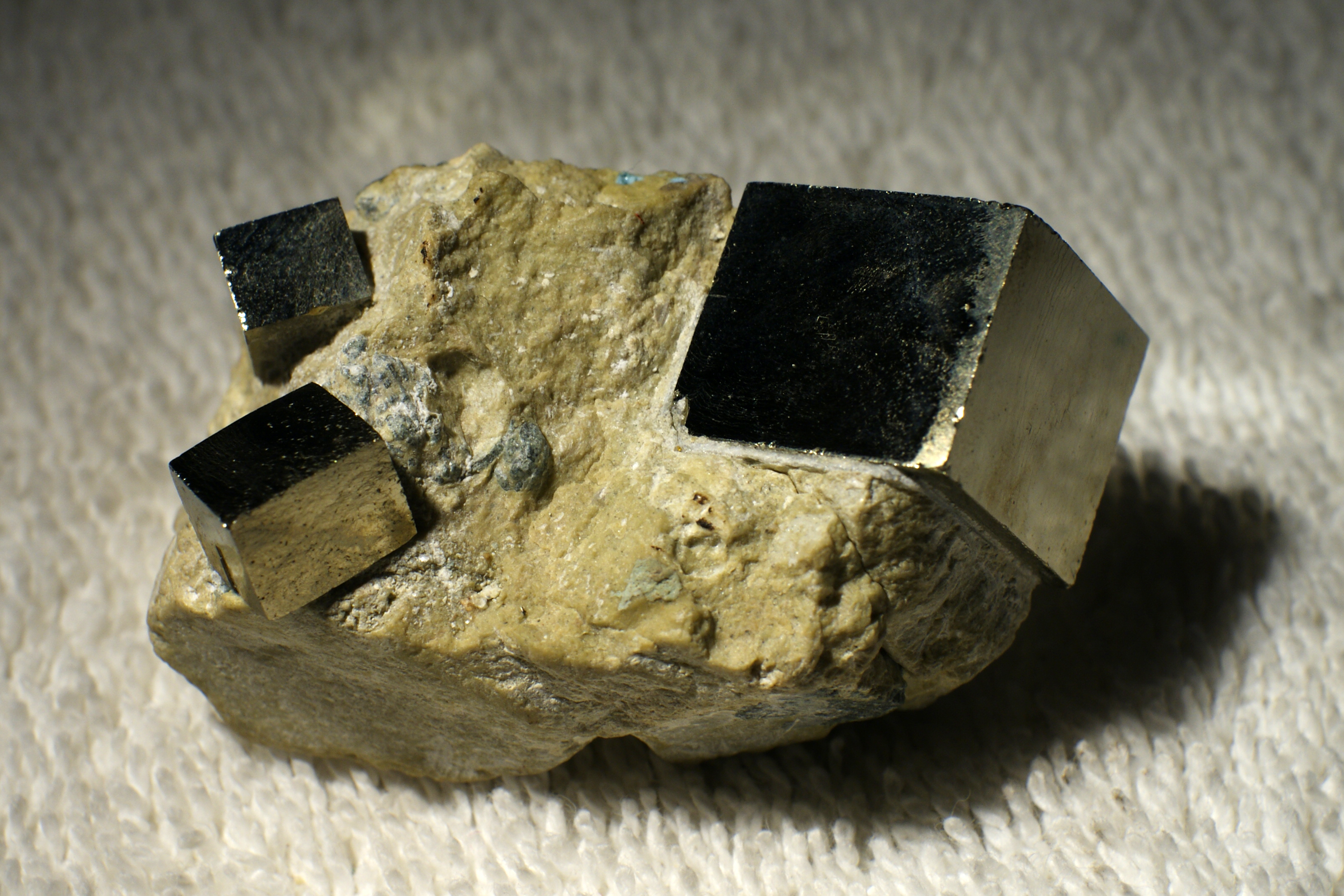
A rock containing three crystals of pyrite (FeS_{2}). The crystal structure of pyrite is primitive cubic, and this is reflected in the cubic symmetry of its natural crystal facets.

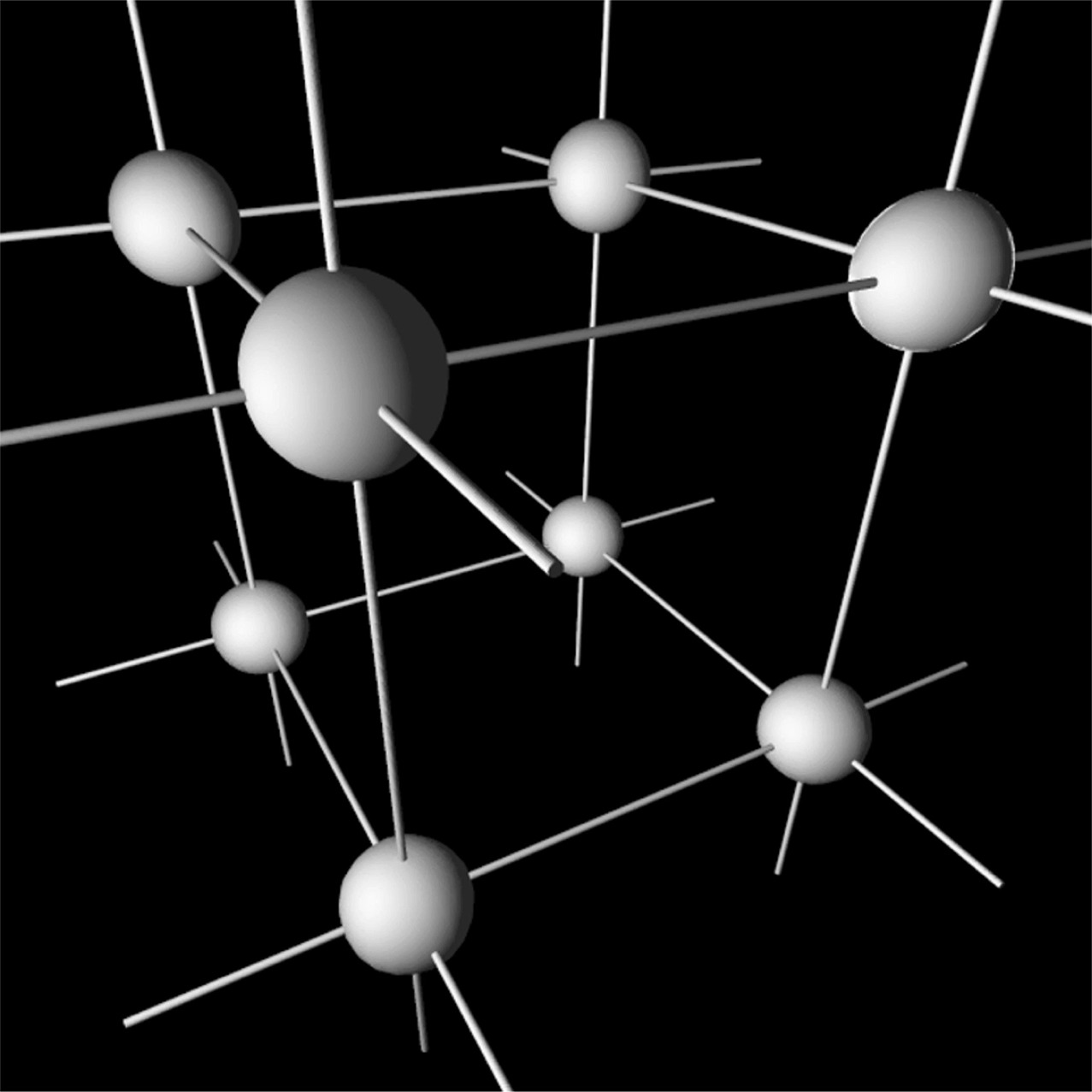
A network model of a primitive cubic system

The primitive and face-centered cubic (also known as cubic close-packed) unit cells

In crystallography, the cubic (or isometric) crystal system is a crystal system where the unit cell is in the shape of a cube. This is one of the most common and simplest shapes found in crystals and minerals.

There are three main varieties of these crystals:

- Primitive cubic (abbreviated cP and alternatively called simple cubic)
- Body-centered cubic (abbreviated cI or bcc)
- Face-centered cubic (abbreviated cF or fcc)

Note: the term fcc is often used synonymously for the cubic close-packed or ccp structure occurring in metals. However, fcc stands for a face-centered cubic Bravais lattice, which is not necessarily close-packed when a motif is set onto the lattice points. E.g. the diamond and the zincblende lattices are fcc but not close-packed. Each is subdivided into other variants listed below. Although the unit cells in these crystals are conventionally taken to be cubes, the primitive unit cells often are not.

== Bravais lattices ==
The three Bravais latices in the cubic crystal system are:

Bravais lattice	Primitive cubic	Body-centered cubic	Face-centered cubic
Pearson symbol	cP	cI	cF
Unit cell			

The primitive cubic lattice (cP) consists of one lattice point on each corner of the cube; this means each simple cubic unit cell has in total one lattice point. Each atom at a lattice point is then shared equally between eight adjacent cubes, and the unit cell therefore contains in total one atom (1/8 × 8) The associated tesselation is trivially the cubic honeycomb.

The body-centered cubic lattice (cI) has one lattice point in the center of the unit cell in addition to the eight corner points. It has a net total of two lattice points per unit cell (1/8 × 8 + 1). The corresponding shape is the rhombic dodecahedral honeycomb or hexakis cubic honeycomb.

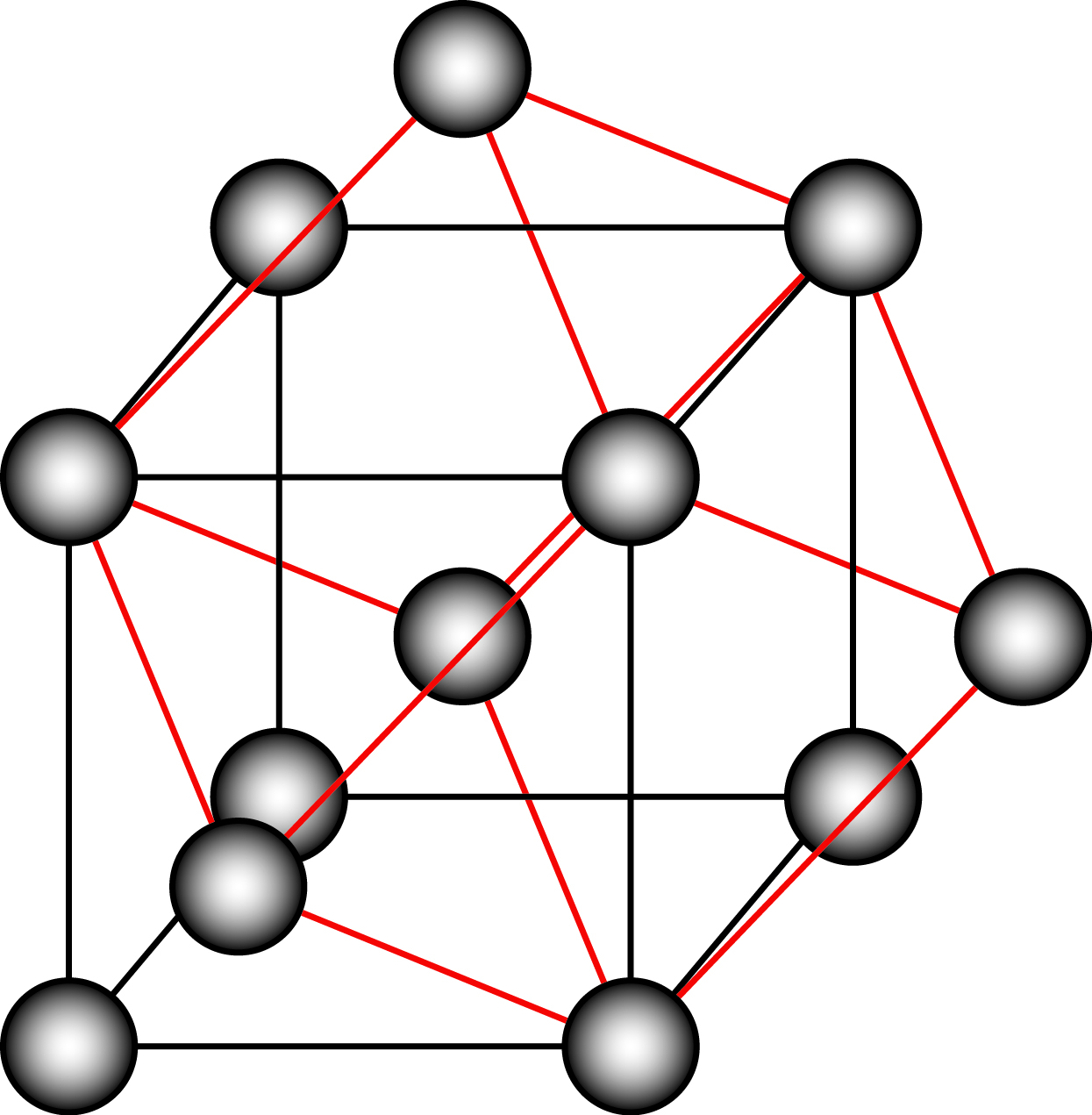
primitive cell of BCC lattice

The face-centered cubic lattice (cF) has lattice points on the faces of the cube that each give exactly one half contribution, in addition to the corner lattice points, giving a total of four lattice points per unit cell (1/8 × 8 from the corners plus 1/2 × 6 from the faces). The corresponding tesselation, when lattice points are taken as vertices, is the tetrahedral-octahedral honeycomb.

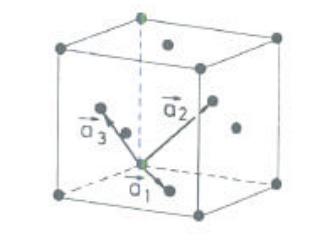
primitive translations of FCC lattice

The face-centered cubic lattice is closely related to the hexagonal close packed (hcp) system, where the two systems differ only in the relative placements of their hexagonal layers. The [111] plane of a face-centered cubic lattice is a hexagonal grid.

Attempting to create a base-centered cubic lattice (i.e., putting an extra lattice point in the center of each horizontal face) results in a simple tetragonal Bravais lattice.

Coordination number (CN) is the number of nearest neighbors of a central atom in the structure. Each sphere in a cP lattice has coordination number 6, in a cI lattice 8, and in a cF lattice 12.

Atomic packing factor (APF) is the fraction of volume that is occupied by atoms. The cP lattice has an APF of about 0.524, the cI lattice an APF of about 0.680, and the cF lattice an APF of about 0.740.

== Crystal classes ==
The isometric crystal system class names, point groups (in Schönflies notation, Hermann–Mauguin notation, orbifold, and Coxeter notation), type, examples, international tables for crystallography space group number, and space groups are listed in the table below. There are a total 36 cubic space groups.

No.	Point group					Type	Example	Space groups		
No.	Name	Schön.	Intl	Orb.	Cox.	Type	Example	Primitive	Face-centered	Body-centered
195–197	Tetartoidal	T	23	332	[3,3]^{+}	enantiomorphic	Ullmannite, Sodium chlorate	P23	F23	I23
198–199	Tetartoidal	T	23	332	[3,3]^{+}	enantiomorphic	Ullmannite, Sodium chlorate	P2_{1}3		I2_{1}3
200–204	Diploidal	T_{h}	m3̅ (2/m 3̅)	3*2	[3^{+},4]	centrosymmetric	Pyrite	Pm3̅, Pn3̅	Fm3̅, Fd3̅	I3̅
205–206	Diploidal	T_{h}	m3̅ (2/m 3̅)	3*2	[3^{+},4]	centrosymmetric	Pyrite	Pa3̅		Ia3̅
207–211	Gyroidal	O	432	432	[3,4]^{+}	enantiomorphic	Petzite	P432, P4_{2}32	F432, F4_{1}32	I432
212–214	Gyroidal	O	432	432	[3,4]^{+}	enantiomorphic	Petzite	P4_{3}32, P4_{1}32		I4_{1}32
215–217	Hextetrahedral	T_{d}	4̅3m	*332	[3,3]		Sphalerite	P4̅3m	F4̅3m	I4̅3m
218–220	Hextetrahedral	T_{d}	4̅3m	*332	[3,3]		Sphalerite	P4̅3n	F4̅3c	I4̅3d
221–230	Hexoctahedral	O_{h}	m3̅m (4/m 3̅ 2/m)	*432	[3,4]	centrosymmetric	Galena, Halite	Pm3̅m, Pn3̅n, Pm3̅n, Pn3̅m	Fm3̅m, Fm3̅c, Fd3̅m, Fd3̅c	Im3̅m, Ia3̅d

Other terms for hexoctahedral are: normal class, holohedral, ditesseral central class, galena type.

== Single element structures ==
Visualisation of a diamond cubic unit cell: 1. Components of a unit cell, 2. One unit cell, 3. A lattice of 3 x 3 x 3 unit cells

As a rule, since atoms in a solid attract each other, the more tightly packed arrangements of atoms tend to be more common. (Loosely packed arrangements do occur, though, for example if the orbital hybridization demands certain bond angles.) Accordingly, the primitive cubic structure, with especially low atomic packing factor, is rare in nature, but is found in polonium. The bcc and fcc, with their higher densities, are both quite common in nature. Examples of bcc include iron, chromium, tungsten, and niobium. Examples of fcc include aluminium, copper, gold and silver.

Another important cubic crystal structure is the diamond cubic structure, which can appear in carbon, silicon, germanium, and tin. Unlike fcc and bcc, this structure is not a lattice, since it contains multiple atoms in its primitive cell. Other cubic elemental structures include the A15 structure found in tungsten, and the extremely complicated structure of manganese.

== Multi-element structures ==
Compounds that consist of more than one element (e.g. binary compounds) often have crystal structures based on the cubic crystal system. Some of the more common ones are listed here. These structures can be viewed as two or more interpenetrating sublattices where each sublattice occupies the interstitial sites of the others.

=== Caesium chloride structure ===
A caesium chloride unit cell. The two colors of spheres represent the two types of atoms.

One structure is the "interpenetrating primitive cubic" structure, also called a "caesium chloride" or B2 structure. This structure is often confused for a body-centered cubic structure because the arrangement of atoms is the same. However, the caesium chloride structure has a basis composed of two different atomic species. In a body-centered cubic structure, there would be translational symmetry along the [111] direction. In the caesium chloride structure, translation along the [111] direction results in a change of species. The structure can also be thought of as two separate simple cubic structures, one of each species, that are superimposed within each other. The corner of the chloride cube is the center of the caesium cube, and vice versa.

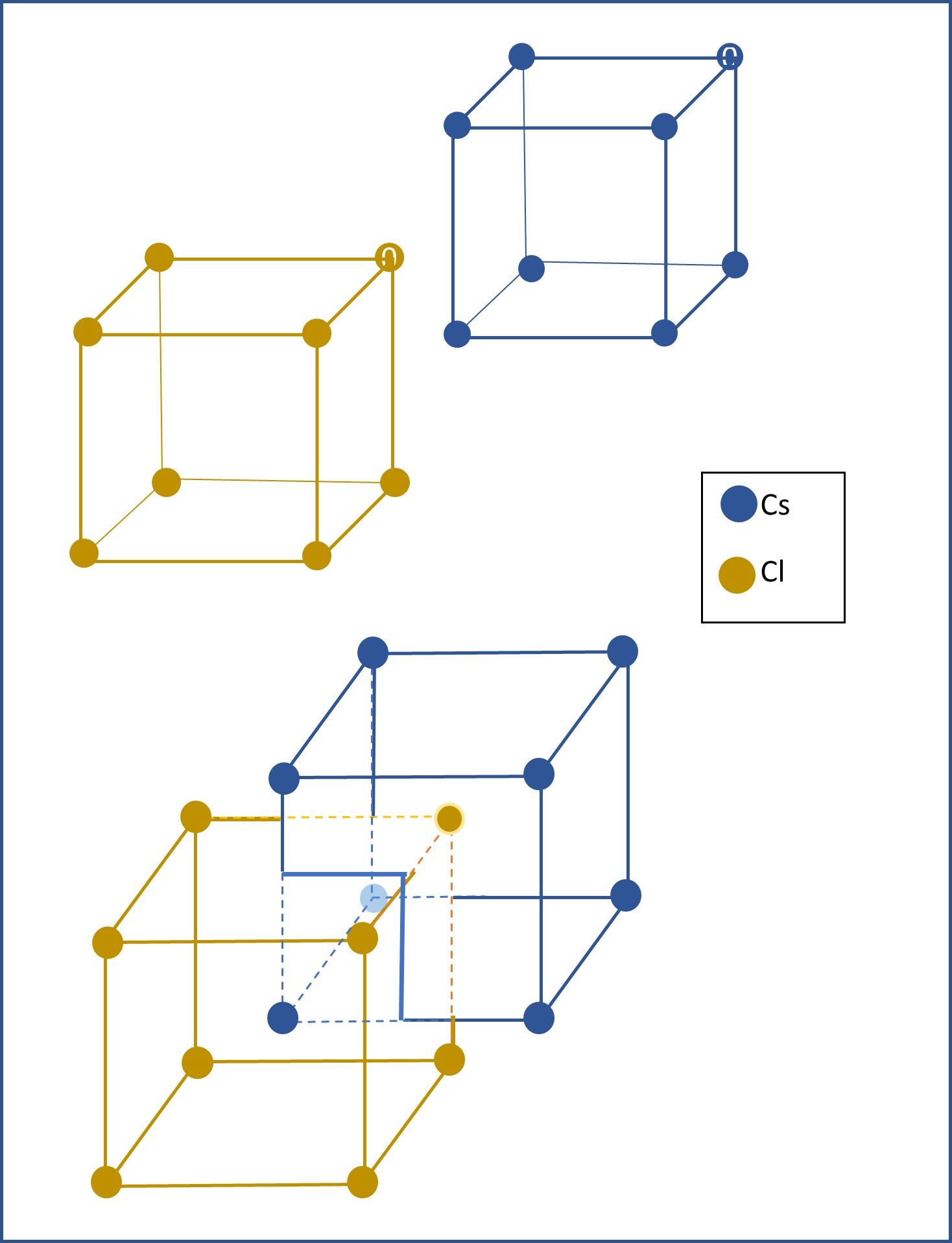
This graphic shows the interlocking simple cubic lattices of cesium and chlorine. You can see them separately and as they are interlocked in what looks like a body-centered cubic arrangement

It works the same way for the NaCl structure described in the next section. If you take out the Cl atoms, the leftover Na atoms still form an FCC structure, not a simple cubic structure.

In the unit cell of CsCl, each ion is at the center of a cube of ions of the opposite kind, so the coordination number is eight. The central cation is coordinated to 8 anions on the corners of a cube as shown, and similarly, the central anion is coordinated to 8 cations on the corners of a cube. Alternately, one could view this lattice as a simple cubic structure with a secondary atom in its cubic void.

In addition to caesium chloride itself, the structure also appears in certain other alkali halides when prepared at low temperatures or high pressures. Generally, this structure is more likely to be formed from two elements whose ions are of roughly the same size (for example, ionic radius of Cs^{+} = 167 pm, and Cl^{−} = 181 pm).

The space group of the caesium chloride (CsCl) structure is called Pm3̅m (in Hermann–Mauguin notation), or "221" (in the International Tables for Crystallography). The Strukturbericht designation is "B2".

There are nearly a hundred rare earth intermetallic compounds that crystallize in the CsCl structure, including many binary compounds of rare earths with magnesium, and with elements in groups 11, 12, and 13. Other compounds showing caesium chloride like structure are CsBr, CsI, high-temperature RbCl, AlCo, AgZn, BeCu, MgCe, RuAl and SrTl.

=== Rock-salt structure ===
The rock-salt crystal structure. Each atom has six nearest neighbours, with octahedral geometry.

The space group of the rock-salt or halite (sodium chloride) structure is denoted as Fm3̅m (in Hermann–Mauguin notation), or "225" (in the International Tables for Crystallography). The Strukturbericht designation is "B1".

In the rock-salt structure, each of the two atom types forms a separate face-centered cubic lattice, with the two lattices interpenetrating so as to form a 3D checkerboard pattern. The rock-salt structure has octahedral coordination: Each atom's nearest neighbors consist of six atoms of the opposite type, positioned like the six vertices of a regular octahedron. In sodium chloride there is a 1:1 ratio of sodium to chlorine atoms. The structure can also be described as an FCC lattice of sodium with chlorine occupying each octahedral void or vice versa.

Examples of compounds with this structure include sodium chloride itself, along with almost all other alkali halides, and "many divalent metal oxides, sulfides, selenides, and tellurides". According to the radius ratio rule, this structure is more likely to be formed if the cation is somewhat smaller than the anion (a cation/anion radius ratio of 0.414 to 0.732).

The interatomic distance (distance between cation and anion, or half the unit cell length a) in some rock-salt-structure crystals are: 2.3 Å (2.3 × 10^{−10} m) for NaF, 2.8 Å for NaCl, and 3.2 Å for SnTe. Most of the alkali metal hydrides and halides have the rock-salt structure, though a few have the caesium chloride structure instead.

Alkali metal hydrides and halides with the rock-salt structure
	Hydrides	Fluorides	Chlorides	Bromides	Iodides
Lithium	Lithium hydride	Lithium fluoride	Lithium chloride	Lithium bromide	Lithium iodide
Sodium	Sodium hydride	Sodium fluoride	Sodium chloride	Sodium bromide	Sodium iodide
Potassium	Potassium hydride	Potassium fluoride	Potassium chloride	Potassium bromide	Potassium iodide
Rubidium	Rubidium hydride	Rubidium fluoride	Rubidium chloride	Rubidium bromide	Rubidium iodide
Caesium	Caesium hydride	Caesium fluoride	(CsCl structure)		

Alkaline earth metal chalcogenides with the rock-salt structure
	Oxides	Sulfides	Selenides	Tellurides	Polonides
Magnesium	Magnesium oxide	Magnesium sulfide	Magnesium selenide	Magnesium telluride	(NiAs structure)
Calcium	Calcium oxide	Calcium sulfide	Calcium selenide	Calcium telluride	Calcium polonide
Strontium	Strontium oxide	Strontium sulfide	Strontium selenide	Strontium telluride	Strontium polonide
Barium	Barium oxide	Barium sulfide	Barium selenide	Barium telluride	Barium polonide

Rare-earth and actinoid pnictides with the rock-salt structure
	Nitrides	Phosphides	Arsenides	Antimonides	Bismuthides
Scandium	Scandium nitride	Scandium phosphide	Scandium arsenide	Scandium antimonide	Scandium bismuthide
Yttrium	Yttrium nitride	Yttrium phosphide	Yttrium arsenide	Yttrium antimonide	Yttrium bismuthide
Lanthanum	Lanthanum nitride	Lanthanum phosphide	Lanthanum arsenide	Lanthanum antimonide	Lanthanum bismuthide
Cerium	Cerium nitride	Cerium phosphide	Cerium arsenide	Cerium antimonide	Cerium bismuthide
Praseodymium	Praseodymium nitride	Praseodymium phosphide	Praseodymium arsenide	Praseodymium antimonide	Praseodymium bismuthide
Neodymium	Neodymium nitride	Neodymium phosphide	Neodymium arsenide	Neodymium antimonide	Neodymium bismuthide
Promethium	?	?	?	?	?
Samarium	Samarium nitride	Samarium phosphide	Samarium arsenide	Samarium antimonide	Samarium bismuthide
Europium	Europium nitride	Europium phosphide	(Na_{2}O_{2} structure)	(unstable)	
Gadolinium	Gadolinium nitride	Gadolinium phosphide	Gadolinium arsenide	Gadolinium antimonide	Gadolinium bismuthide
Terbium	Terbium nitride	Terbium phosphide	Terbium arsenide	Terbium antimonide	Terbium bismuthide
Dysprosium	Dysprosium nitride	Dysprosium phosphide	Dysprosium arsenide	Dysprosium antimonide	Dysprosium bismuthide
Holmium	Holmium nitride	Holmium phosphide	Holmium arsenide	Holmium antimonide	Holmium bismuthide
Erbium	Erbium nitride	Erbium phosphide	Erbium arsenide	Erbium antimonide	Erbium bismuthide
Thulium	Thulium nitride	Thulium phosphide	Thulium arsenide	Thulium antimonide	Thulium bismuthide
Ytterbium	Ytterbium nitride	Ytterbium phosphide	Ytterbium arsenide	Ytterbium antimonide	(unstable)
Lutetium	Lutetium nitride	Lutetium phosphide	Lutetium arsenide	Lutetium antimonide	Lutetium bismuthide
Actinium	?	?	?	?	?
Thorium	Thorium nitride	Thorium phosphide	Thorium arsenide	Thorium antimonide	(CsCl structure)
Protactinium	?	?	?	?	?
Uranium	Uranium nitride	Uranium monophosphide	Uranium arsenide	Uranium antimonide	Uranium bismuthide
Neptunium	Neptunium nitride	Neptunium phosphide	Neptunium arsenide	Neptunium antimonide	Neptunium bismuthide
Plutonium	Plutonium nitride	Plutonium phosphide	Plutonium arsenide	Plutonium antimonide	Plutonium bismuthide
Americium	Americium nitride	Americium phosphide	Americium arsenide	Americium antimonide	Americium bismuthide
Curium	Curium nitride	Curium phosphide	Curium arsenide	Curium antimonide	Curium bismuthide
Berkelium	Berkelium nitride	Berkelium phosphide	Berkelium arsenide	?	Berkelium bismuthide
Californium	?	?	Californium arsenide	?	Californium bismuthide

Rare-earth and actinoid chalcogenides with the rock-salt structure
	Oxides	Sulfides	Selenides	Tellurides	Polonides
Scandium	(unstable)	Scandium monosulfide			
Yttrium	(unstable)	Yttrium monosulfide			
Lanthanum	(unstable)	Lanthanum monosulfide			
Cerium	(unstable)	Cerium monosulfide	Cerium monoselenide	Cerium monotelluride	
Praseodymium	(unstable)	Praseodymium monosulfide	Praseodymium monoselenide	Praseodymium monotelluride	
Neodymium	(unstable)	Neodymium monosulfide	Neodymium monoselenide	Neodymium monotelluride	
Promethium	(unstable)	?	?	?	?
Samarium	(unstable)	Samarium monosulfide	Samarium monoselenide	Samarium monotelluride	Samarium monopolonide
Europium	Europium monoxide	Europium monosulfide	Europium monoselenide	Europium monotelluride	Europium monopolonide
Gadolinium	(unstable)	Gadolinium monosulfide			
Terbium	(unstable)	Terbium monosulfide			Terbium monopolonide
Dysprosium	(unstable)	Dysprosium monosulfide			Dysprosium monopolonide
Holmium	(unstable)	Holmium monosulfide			Holmium monopolonide
Erbium	(unstable)	Erbium monosulfide			
Thulium	(unstable)	Thulium monosulfide			Thulium monopolonide
Ytterbium	Ytterbium monoxide	Ytterbium monosulfide			Ytterbium monopolonide
Lutetium	(unstable)	Lutetium monosulfide			Lutetium monopolonide
Actinium	(unstable)	?	?	?	?
Thorium	(unstable)	Thorium monosulfide	Thorium monoselenide	(CsCl structure)	
Protactinium	(unstable)	?	?	?	?
Uranium	(unstable)	Uranium monosulfide	Uranium monoselenide	Uranium monotelluride	
Neptunium	(unstable)	Neptunium monosulfide	Neptunium monoselenide	Neptunium monotelluride	
Plutonium	(unstable)	Plutonium monosulfide	Plutonium monoselenide	Plutonium monotelluride	
Americium	(unstable)	Americium monosulfide	Americium monoselenide	Americium monotelluride	
Curium	(unstable)	Curium monosulfide	Curium monoselenide	Curium monotelluride	

Transition metal carbides and nitrides with the rock-salt structure
	Carbides	Nitrides
Titanium	Titanium carbide	Titanium nitride
Zirconium	Zirconium carbide	Zirconium nitride
Hafnium	Hafnium carbide	Hafnium nitride
Vanadium	Vanadium carbide	Vanadium nitride
Niobium	Niobium carbide	Niobium nitride
Tantalum	Tantalum carbide	(CoSn structure)
Chromium	(unstable)	Chromium nitride

Many transition metal monoxides also have the rock-salt structure (TiO, VO, CrO, MnO, FeO, CoO, NiO, CdO). The early actinoid monocarbides also have this structure (ThC, PaC, UC, NpC, PuC).

=== Fluorite structure ===
Much like the rock-salt structure, the fluorite structure (AB_{2}) is also an Fm3̅m structure but has 1:2 ratio of ions. The anti-fluorite structure is nearly identical, except the positions of the anions and cations are switched in the structure. They are designated Wyckoff positions 4a and 8c whereas the rock-salt structure positions are 4a and 4b.

=== Zincblende structure ===
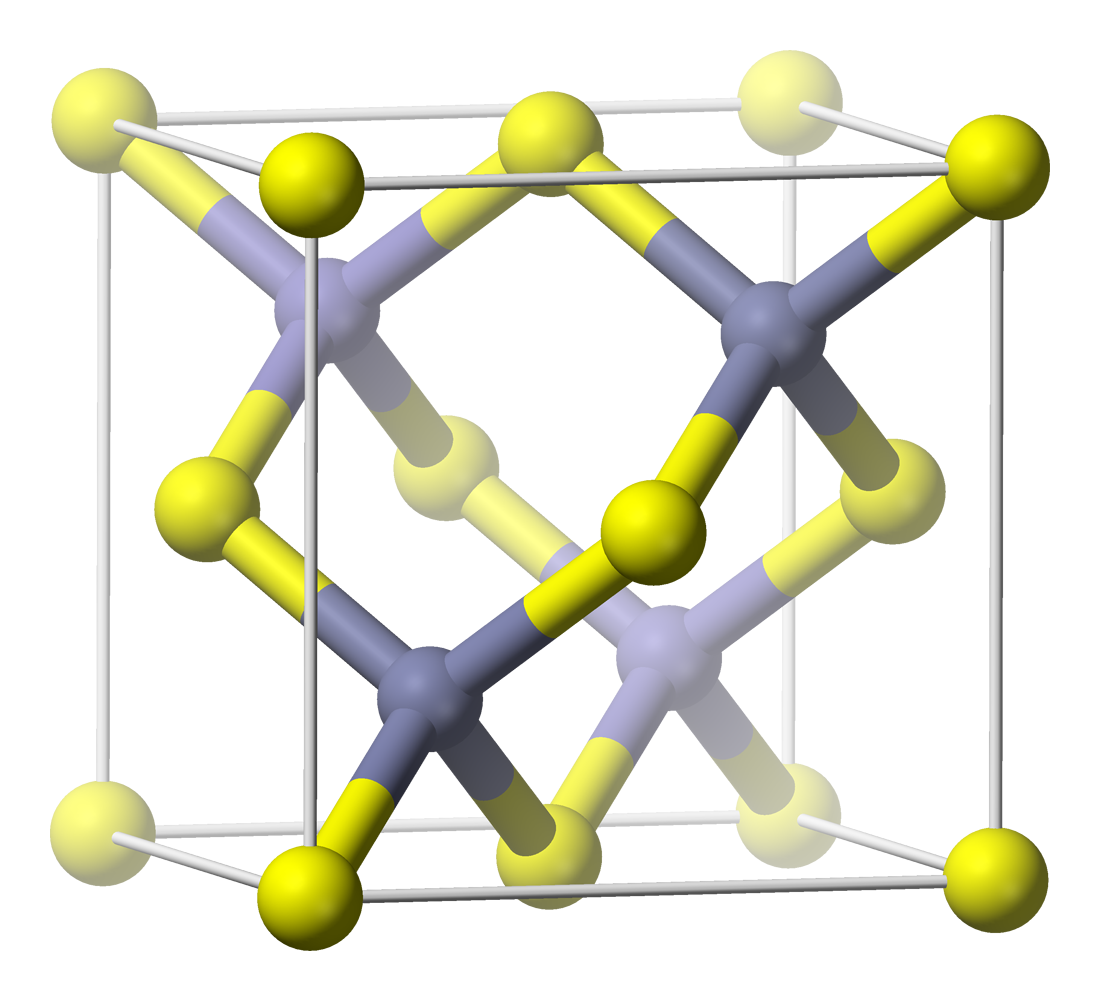
A zincblende unit cell

The space group of the Zincblende structure is called F4̅3m (in Hermann–Mauguin notation), or 216. The Strukturbericht designation is "B3".

The Zincblende structure (also written "zinc blende") is named after the mineral zincblende (sphalerite), one form of zinc sulfide (β-ZnS). As in the rock-salt structure, the two atom types form two interpenetrating face-centered cubic lattices. However, it differs from rock-salt structure in how the two lattices are positioned relative to one another. The zincblende structure has tetrahedral coordination: Each atom's nearest neighbors consist of four atoms of the opposite type, positioned like the four vertices of a regular tetrahedron. In zinc sulfide the ratio of zinc to sulfur is 1:1. Altogether, the arrangement of atoms in zincblende structure is the same as diamond cubic structure, but with alternating types of atoms at the different lattice sites. The structure can also be described as an FCC lattice of zinc with sulfur atoms occupying half of the tetrahedral voids or vice versa.

Examples of compounds with this structure include zincblende itself, lead(II) nitrate, many compound semiconductors (such as gallium arsenide and cadmium telluride), and a wide array of other binary compounds. The boron group pnictogenides usually have a zincblende structure, though the nitrides are more common in the wurtzite structure, and their zincblende forms are less well known polymorphs.

Copper halides with the zincblende structure
	Fluorides	Chlorides	Bromides	Iodides
Copper	Copper(I) fluoride	Copper(I) chloride	Copper(I) bromide	Copper(I) iodide

Beryllium and Group 12 chalcogenides with the zincblende structure
	Sulfides	Selenides	Tellurides	Polonides
Beryllium	Beryllium sulfide	Beryllium selenide	Beryllium telluride	Beryllium polonide
Zinc	Zinc sulfide	Zinc selenide	Zinc telluride	Zinc polonide
Cadmium	Cadmium sulfide	Cadmium selenide	Cadmium telluride	Cadmium polonide
Mercury	Mercury sulfide	Mercury selenide	Mercury telluride	–

This group is also known as the II-VI family of compounds, most of which can be made in both the zincblende (cubic) or wurtzite (hexagonal) form.

Group 13 pnictogenides with the zincblende structure
	Nitrides	Phosphides	Arsenides	Antimonides
Boron	Boron nitride*	Boron phosphide	Boron arsenide	Boron antimonide
Aluminium	Aluminium nitride*	Aluminium phosphide	Aluminium arsenide	Aluminium antimonide
Gallium	Gallium nitride*	Gallium phosphide	Gallium arsenide	Gallium antimonide
Indium	Indium nitride*	Indium phosphide	Indium arsenide	Indium antimonide

This group is also known as the III-V family of compounds.

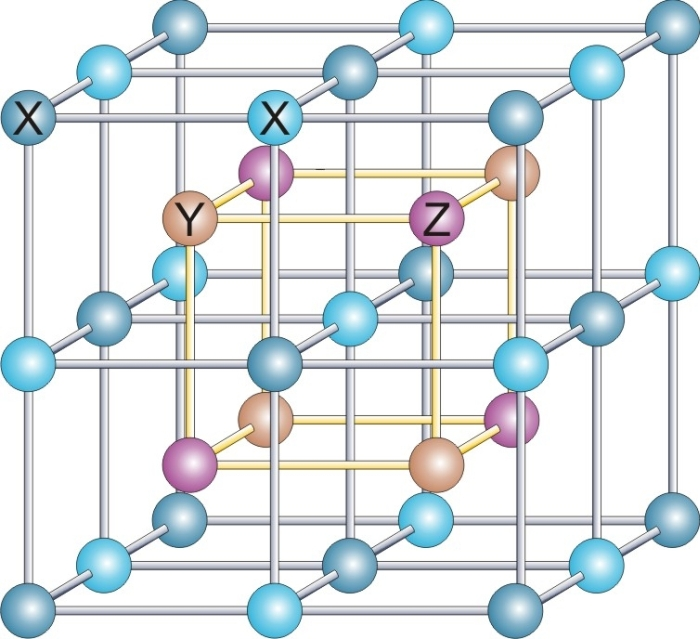
The structure of the Heusler compounds with formula X_{2}YZ (e. g., Co_{2}MnSi).

=== Heusler structure ===
The Heusler structure, based on the structure of Cu_{2}MnAl, is a common structure for ternary compounds involving transition metals. It has the space group Fm3̅m (No. 225), and the Strukturbericht designation is L2_{1}. Together with the closely related half-Heusler and inverse-Huesler compounds, there are hundreds of examples.

=== Iron monosilicide structure ===
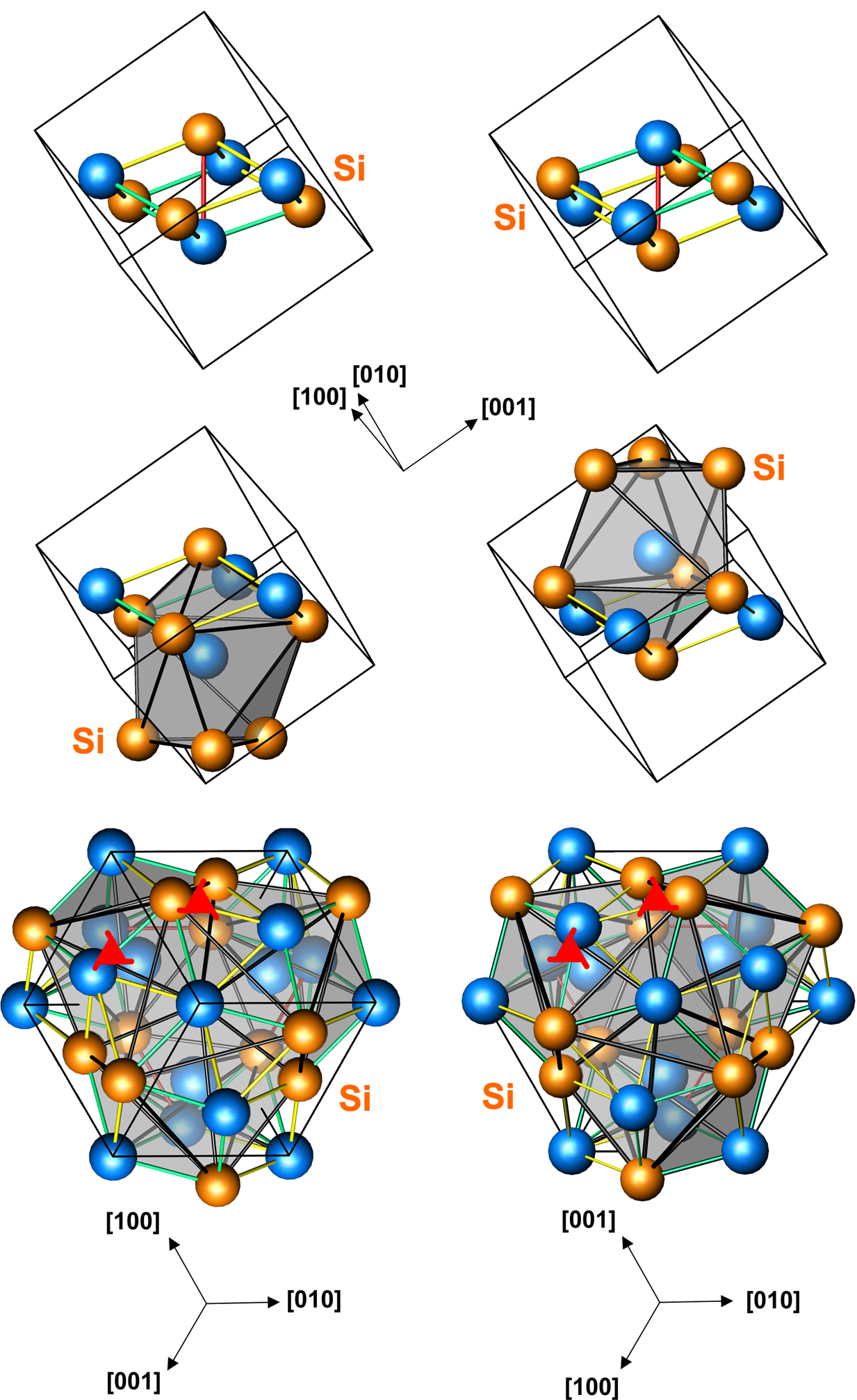
Diagram of the iron monosilicide structure.

The space group of the iron monosilicide structure is P2_{1}3 (No. 198), and the Strukturbericht designation is B20. This is a chiral structure, and is sometimes associated with helimagnetic properties. There are four atoms of each element for a total of eight atoms in the unit cell.

Examples occur among the transition metal silicides and germanides, as well as a few other compounds such as gallium palladide.

Transition metal silicides and germanides with the FeSi structure
	Silicides	Germanides
Chromium	Chromium(IV) silicide	Chromium(IV) germanide
Manganese	Manganese monosilicide	Manganese germanide
Iron	Iron monosilicide	Iron germanide
Cobalt	Cobalt monosilicide	Cobalt germanide

== Weaire–Phelan structure ==
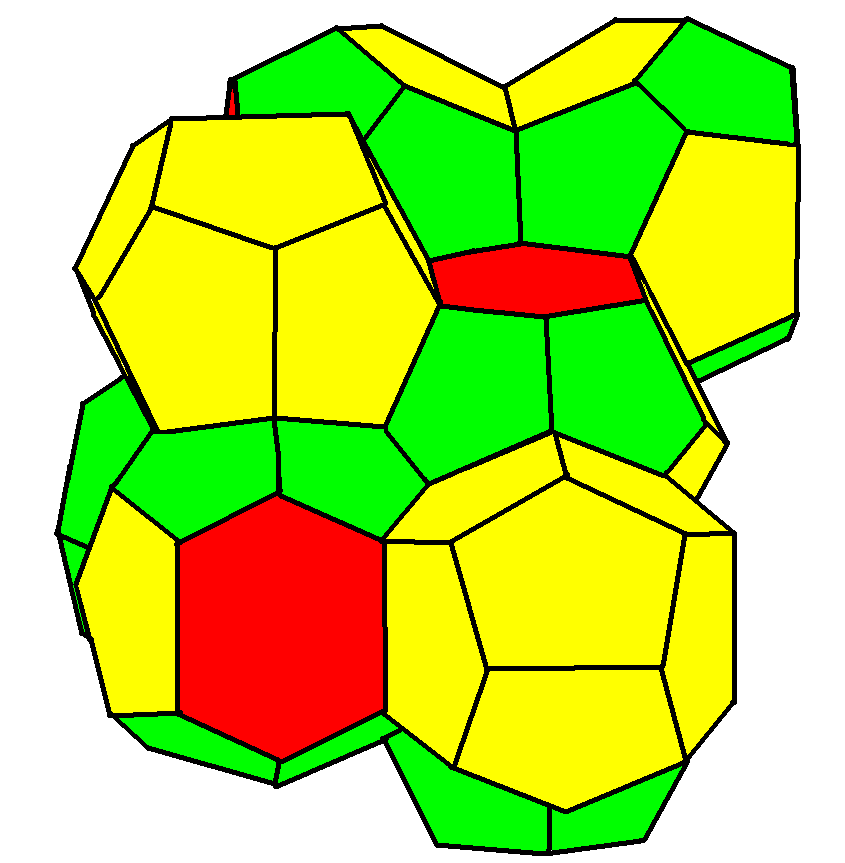
Weaire–Phelan structure

A Weaire–Phelan structure has Pm3̅n (223) symmetry.

It has three orientations of stacked tetradecahedrons with pyritohedral cells in the gaps. It is found as a crystal structure in chemistry where it is usually known as a "type I clathrate structure". Gas hydrates formed by methane, propane, and carbon dioxide at low temperatures have a structure in which water molecules lie at the nodes of the Weaire–Phelan structure and are hydrogen bonded together, and the larger gas molecules are trapped in the polyhedral cages.

== See also ==
- Atomium: building which is a model of a bcc unit cell, with vertical body diagonal.
- Close-packing
- Dislocations
- Reciprocal lattice
