= Praseodymium monoselenide =

Identifiers
CAS Number	12038-08-3
3D model (JSmol)	Interactive image
ChemSpider	95747165
ECHA InfoCard	100.031.689
EC Number	234-872-0
CompTox Dashboard (EPA)	DTXSID5065198
- InChI: InChI=1S/Pr.Se Key: FAEQPLMETHVSSH-UHFFFAOYSA-N
- SMILES: [Pr].[Se]

Properties
Chemical formula	PrSe
Molar mass	219.87
Density	6.9 g/cm^{3}
Melting point	2,100 °C (3,810 °F; 2,370 K)

Related compounds
Other anions	PrS; PrTe
Other cations	CeSe; NdSe
Related compounds	Pr_{2}Se_{3}
- Except where otherwise noted, data are given for materials in their standard state (at 25 °C [77 °F], 100 kPa). Infobox references

Praseodymium monoselenide is a compound with the chemical formula PrSe. It forms crystals.

== Preparation ==
Praseodymium monoselenide can be prepared by directly reacting praseodymium and selenium at 2100 °C:

Pr + Se → PrSe

The temperature at which selenium and praseodymium start to react when they come into contact is 620 K.

== Properties ==
Praseodymium monoselenide forms cubic crystals, space group Fm3̅m, unit cell parameters a = 0.5741 nm, Z = 4, and a structure similar to that of sodium chloride.

The compound melts congruently at 2100 °C.
