= Plutonium selenide =

Names
- Other names Plutonium monoselenide, Plutonium(II) selenide

Identifiers
CAS Number	23299-88-9
3D model (JSmol)	Interactive image
ChemSpider	129549264
- InChI: InChI=1S/Pu.Se Key: IJHCCJHFYQUWOM-UHFFFAOYSA-N
- SMILES: [Pu].[Se]

Properties
Chemical formula	PuSe
Molar mass	323.024
Appearance	Black crystals
Melting point	2,075 °C (3,767 °F; 2,348 K)
Solubility in water	insoluble

Hazards
- GHS labelling
Signal word	Warning

Related compounds
Other anions	Plutonium sulfide Plutonium telluride
Other cations	Magnesium selenide Strontium selenide Barium selenide Iron(II) selenide Iron(III) selenide Lead(II) selenide Praseodymium selenide
- Except where otherwise noted, data are given for materials in their standard state (at 25 °C [77 °F], 100 kPa). Infobox references

Plutonium selenide is a binary inorganic compound of plutonium and selenium with the chemical formula PuSe. The compound forms black crystals and does not dissolve in water.

== Synthesis ==
Reaction of diplutonium triselenide and plutonium trihydride:

$$\ce{2 {Pu2Se3} + 2 {PuH3} ->[\text{1600 °C}] 4 {PuSe} + 3 {H2}}$$

Fusion of stoichiometric amounts of pure substances:

$$\ce{{Pu} + {Se} ->[\text{220–1000 °C}] PuSe}$$

== Properties ==
Plutonium selenide forms black crystals of a cubic system, space group Fm3̅m, unit cell dimension a = 0.57934 nm, Z = 4, with structure of the NaCl type.

With increasing pressure, two phase transitions occur: at 20 GPa into the trigonal system and at 35 GPa into the cubic system, a structure of the CsCl type.

Its magnetic susceptibility follows the Curie-Weiss law.
