= Monosulfide =

Monosulfide may refer to:

- Carbon monosulfide, chemical compound with the formula CS
- Cerium monosulfide, chemical compound with the formula CeS
- Chromium monosulfide, chemical compound with the formula CrS
- Cobalt monosulfide, chemical compound with the formula CoS
- Copper monosulfide, chemical compound with the formula CuS
- Europium monosulfide, chemical compound with the formula EuS
- Gallium monosulfide, chemical compound with the formula GaS
- Germanium monosulfide, chemical compound with the formula GeS
- Manganese monosulfide, chemical compound with the formula MnS
- Mononitrogen monosulfide, inorganic compound with the formula SN
- Iron monosulfide, chemical compound with the formula FeS
- Lead monosulfide, chemical compound with the formula PbS
- Palladium monosulfide, chemical compound with the formula PdS
- Platinum monosulfide, chemical compound with the formula PtS
- Polonium monosulfide, chemical compound with the formula PoS
- Samarium monosulfide, chemical compound with the formula SmS
- Silicon monosulfide, chemical compound with the formula SiS
- Scandium monosulfide, chemical compound of scandium and sulfur with the chemical formula ScS
- Tin monosulfide, chemical compound with the formula SnS
- Titanium monosulfide, chemical compound with the formula TiS
- Uranium monosulfide, chemical compound with the formula US
- Ytterbium monosulfide, chemical compound with the formula YbS
