= Samarium(III) antimonide =

Names
- Other names: Samarium(III) antimony; Antimony-Samarium

Identifiers
CAS Number	29664-84-4
3D model (JSmol)	Interactive image
ChemSpider	109171
ECHA InfoCard	100.045.224
EC Number	249-762-8
PubChem CID	122445
CompTox Dashboard (EPA)	DTXSID8067494
- InChI: InChI=1S/Sb.Sm Key: JQVBLEDYHQAMKN-UHFFFAOYSA-N
- SMILES: [Sb].[Sm]

Properties
Chemical formula	PrSb
Molar mass	272.12 g/mol
Density	7.3 g/cm^{3}
Melting point	1922 °C

Related compounds
Other anions	SmN, SmP, SmAs, SmBi, Sm_{2}O_{3}
Other cations	PrSb, NdSb
- Except where otherwise noted, data are given for materials in their standard state (at 25 °C [77 °F], 100 kPa). Infobox references

Samarium antimonide is a binary inorganic compound of samarium and antimony with the formula SmSb. It forms crystals.

== Preparation ==
Samarium antimonide can be prepared by heating samarium and antimony in a vacuum:

$$\mathsf{ Sm + Sb \ \xrightarrow{1922^oC}\ SmSb }$$

== Physical properties ==
Samarium antimonide forms cubic crystals, space group Fm3m, cell parameters a = 0.6271 nm, Z = 4, and structure like sodium chloride.

The compound melts congruently at a temperature of ≈2000 °C or 1922 °C.
