= Lanthanum phosphide =

Names
- Other names Phosphanylidynelanthanum

Identifiers
CAS Number	25275-74-5
3D model (JSmol)	Interactive image
ChemSpider	82505
ECHA InfoCard	100.042.515
EC Number	246-782-9
PubChem CID	91371
CompTox Dashboard (EPA)	DTXSID401311967
- InChI: InChI=1S/La.P Key: GZHCNRONBGZNAH-UHFFFAOYSA-N
- SMILES: P#[La]

Properties
Chemical formula	LaP
Molar mass	169.88
Appearance	Black crystals
Density	5.2 g/cm^{3}
Solubility in water	Reacts with water

Structure
Crystal structure	Rock salt structure
Space group	Fm3̅m
Lattice constant	a = 0.6025 nm
Formula units (Z)	4
Coordination geometry	Octahedral at La^{3+}, Octahedral at P^{3-}

Related compounds
Other anions	Lanthanum nitride Lanthanum arsenide Lanthanum bismuthide
Other cations	Scandium phosphide Yttrium phosphide Cerium phosphide
- Except where otherwise noted, data are given for materials in their standard state (at 25 °C [77 °F], 100 kPa). Infobox references

Lanthanum phosphide is an inorganic compound of lanthanum and phosphorus with the chemical formula LaP.

== Synthesis ==
Lanthanum phosphide can be made by heating lanthanum metal with excess phosphorus in a vacuum:

4 La + P_{4} → 4 LaP

== Physical properties ==
Lanthanum phosphide forms black crystals of a cubic system, space group Fm3̅m, cell parameters a = 0.6025 nm, with number of formulas per unit cell Z = 4.

The crystals are very unstable and decompose in the open air.

== Electronic properties ==
Lanthanum phosphide is an example of a strongly correlated material, complicating theoretical prediction of its properties.

According to HSE06 calculations, lanthanum phosphide has been theoretically predicted to have an indirect band gap of 0.25 eV along the Γ-X direction. According to HSE06 calculations with spin-orbit coupling, the band gap is predicted to be a direct gap of 0.72 eV at the X point. Using EVGGA, the compound is predicted to have a band gap of 0.56 eV along the Γ-X direction. FP-LAPW has predicted an indirect gap of 0.33 eV along the Γ-X direction.

== Chemical properties ==
Lanthanum phosphide reacts with water, releasing highly toxic phosphine gas:

LaP + 3H_{2}O → La(OH)_{3} + PH_{3}

== Uses ==
Lanthanum phosphide is a semiconductor used in high power, high frequency applications, and in laser diodes.

== Lanthanum polyphosphide ==
In addition to the simple phosphide, LaP, lanthanum and phosphorus can also form phosphorus-rich compounds such as LaP_{2} LaP_{5} and LaP_{7}.
