= Samarium(III) phosphide =

Names
- Other names Phosphanylidynesamarium, samarium monophosphide

Identifiers
CAS Number	12066-50-1
3D model (JSmol)	Interactive image
ChemSpider	74806
ECHA InfoCard	100.031.869
EC Number	235-069-8
PubChem CID	82905
CompTox Dashboard (EPA)	DTXSID601313202
- InChI: InChI=1S/P.Sm Key: QRVXKVFNBYFEOG-UHFFFAOYSA-N
- SMILES: P#[Sm]

Properties
Chemical formula	PSm
Molar mass	181.3
Appearance	Crystals
Density	6.3 g/cm^{3}
Solubility in water	Insoluble

Structure
Crystal structure	Cubic

Related compounds
Other anions	Samarium nitride Samarium arsenide Samarium antimonide Samarium bismuthide
Other cations	Neodymium phosphide Europium phosphide
- Except where otherwise noted, data are given for materials in their standard state (at 25 °C [77 °F], 100 kPa). Infobox references

Samarium(III) phosphide is an inorganic compound of samarium and phosphorus with the chemical formula SmP.

== Synthesis ==
Samarium(III) phosphide can be obtained by heating samarium and phosphorus:

4 Sm + P_{4} → 4 SmP

== Physical properties ==
Samarium(III) phosphide forms crystals of a cubic system, space group Fm3m, cell size a = 0.5760 nm, Z = 4, with a structure similar to sodium chloride NaCl.

The compound exists in the temperature range of 1315–2020 °C and has a homogeneity region described by SmP_{1÷0.982}.

== Chemical properties ==
Samarium(III) phosphide readily dissolves in nitric acid.

== Uses ==
Samarium(III) phosphide compound is a semiconductor used in high power, high frequency applications and in laser diodes.
