= Uranium sulfide =

Uranium sulfide may refer to:

- Uranium monosulfide, US
- Uranium disulfide, US_{2}
