= Berkelium(III) phosphide =

Names
- Other names berkelium monophosphide

Identifiers
| 3D model (JSmol) | Interactive image |
- InChI: InChI=1S/Bk.P/q+3;-3 Key: NFBHOAQVERQHTJ-UHFFFAOYSA-N
- SMILES: [Bk+3].[P-3]

Properties
| Chemical formula | BkP |
| Molar mass | 278 g·mol^{−1} |

Related compounds
| Related compounds | Plutonium(III) phosphide |
- Except where otherwise noted, data are given for materials in their standard state (at 25 °C [77 °F], 100 kPa). Infobox references

Berkelium(III) phosphide is a binary inorganic compound of berkelium and phosphorus with the chemical formula BkP.

== Preparation ==
Berkelium(III) phosphide can be prepared by reacting berkelium with an excess of phosphorus at 540 °C:

4 Bk + P_{4} → 4 BkP

== Properties ==
Berkelium(III) phosphide crystallises in the cubic crystal system of the sodium chloride type. Its lattice constant of 5.669 Å.
