= Holmium monosulfide =

Names
- Other names Holmium(II) sulfide

Identifiers
3D model (JSmol)	Interactive image
- InChI: InChI=HPVHCMSDBCPPSZ-UHFFFAOYSA-N Key: 1S/Ho.S
- SMILES: [Ho].[S]

Properties
Chemical formula	HoS
Molar mass	196.99 g·mol^{−1}
Appearance	Crystals
Density	8.0 g/cm^{3}

Related compounds
Related compounds	Samarium monosulfide
- Except where otherwise noted, data are given for materials in their standard state (at 25 °C [77 °F], 100 kPa). Infobox references

Holmium monosulfide is a binary inorganic compound of holmium and sulfur with the chemical formula HoS.

== Synthesis ==
Heating stoichiometric amounts of pure substances in an inert atmosphere:

Ho + S → HoS

== Physical properties ==
Holmium monosulfide forms crystals of cubic system, space group Fm3m, unit cell parameter a = 0.5465 nm, Z = 4, isomorphous with NaCl.

== Uses ==
HoS is an attractive material for potential application in electronic and magnetic recording devices.
