= Europium selenide =

Europium selenide may refer to:

- Europium(II) selenide
- Europium(III) selenide
