= Neodymium monoselenide =

Names
- Other names Neodymium selenide

Identifiers
CAS Number	12035-24-4

Properties
Chemical formula	NdSe
Molar mass	223.20 g/mol
Appearance	Crystalline solid
Density	7.218 g/cm^{3} (calculated)

Structure
Crystal structure	Cubic, rock salt
Space group	Fm3̅m (No. 225)
Lattice constant	a = 5.900 Å
Formula units (Z)	4
- Except where otherwise noted, data are given for materials in their standard state (at 25 °C [77 °F], 100 kPa). Infobox references

Neodymium monoselenide is a binary inorganic compound of neodymium and selenium with the formula NdSe. It is a refractory rare-earth monochalcogenide that crystallizes in the cubic rock salt structure. NdSe exhibits metallic or highly degenerate semiconducting electrical behavior and becomes antiferromagnetic at low temperature.

Although the stoichiometric formula can formally be written in terms of Nd^{2+} and Se^{2−}, the electronic properties of NdSe differ substantially from those of genuinely divalent rare-earth monochalcogenides such as samarium selenide and ytterbium selenide. Transport studies classify NdSe among the normally trivalent rare-earth monochalcogenides, in which an additional electron occupies an itinerant conduction band.

== Preparation ==
Neodymium monoselenide can be prepared by direct reaction of elemental neodymium and selenium:

Nd + Se → NdSe

The interaction between neodymium and selenium begins at approximately 620 K. In a 1:1 mixture, reaction occurs over a broad temperature range extending to approximately 870 K, with layers of neodymium selenides forming around the reacting material and slowing further diffusion. After heating a 1:1 neodymium–selenium mixture to 1270 K, NdSe is the principal crystalline product, although Nd_{3}Se_{4} and unreacted neodymium can remain if the reaction is incomplete.

NdSe can be obtained in homogeneous form by fusion of stoichiometric quantities of the elements at higher temperature.

== Properties ==
=== Crystal structure ===
At ambient conditions, neodymium monoselenide crystallizes in the cubic crystal system with the rock salt structure, space group Fm3̅m (No. 225), with four formula units per unit cell. Neodymium and selenium each occupy interpenetrating face-centered cubic sublattices, so that every Nd atom is octahedrally coordinated by six selenium atoms and every Se atom by six neodymium atoms.

Early X-ray measurements gave lattice parameters of 5.909 Å and 5.891 Å. The National Bureau of Standards adopted their mean value, a = 5.900 Å, for its calculated powder-diffraction pattern, corresponding to a calculated density of 7.218 g cm^{−3}.

NdSe is one of a series of isostructural neodymium monochalcogenides, together with NdS and NdTe.

=== Electronic properties ===
NdSe is an electrically conducting material. Rare-earth monoselenides and monotellurides can be divided broadly into compounds of normally divalent rare-earth elements, such as Sm and Yb, which have relatively high resistivities and semiconductor-like temperature dependence, and compounds of normally trivalent elements such as Nd and Gd, which have much lower resistivities and positive temperature coefficients characteristic of metallic or strongly degenerate semiconducting conduction.

The low resistivity of NdSe is therefore inconsistent with a simple localized Nd^{2+} 4f^{4} description. Its electronic structure is instead associated with predominantly trivalent neodymium and an itinerant conduction electron.

First-principles calculations likewise find electronic states at the Fermi level with strong Nd 4f character and weaker hybridization between Nd 5d and Se 4p states.

=== Magnetic properties ===
Neodymium monoselenide is paramagnetic at higher temperatures and undergoes antiferromagnetic ordering at approximately 11 K.

Neutron-diffraction measurements show that NdSe adopts an antiferromagnetic FCC type-II structure at low temperature, similar to the magnetic structures of MnO and FeO. At 4.2 K, the neodymium moments are oriented along a ⟨111⟩ direction, and an ordered magnetic moment of approximately 3.52 μ_{B} per neodymium atom has been reported.

Magnetic ordering is coupled to the crystal lattice. On cooling through the Néel temperature, NdSe undergoes a first-order distortion from the cubic structure to a slightly tetragonal structure. A second transition between different antiferromagnetic arrangements occurs at still lower temperature. Applied magnetic fields can produce additional magnetic phases.

The low-temperature magnetic behavior is influenced by the crystal field acting on the Nd^{3+} 4f states, as well as by exchange interactions between the neodymium ions.

== See also ==
- Neodymium monosulfide
- Neodymium ditelluride
- Neodymium(III) selenide
