= Europium(III) phosphide =

Names
- Other names Phosphanylidyneeuropium, Europium phosphide

Identifiers
CAS Number	28866-07-1
3D model (JSmol)	Interactive image
ChemSpider	107191
ECHA InfoCard	100.044.780
EC Number	249-274-5
PubChem CID	120069
CompTox Dashboard (EPA)	DTXSID401313068
- InChI: InChI=1S/Eu.P Key: UXXSRDYSXZIJEN-UHFFFAOYSA-N
- SMILES: P#[Eu]

Properties
Chemical formula	EuP
Molar mass	182.94
Appearance	Dark crystals
Density	g/cm^{3}
Melting point	2,200 °C (3,990 °F; 2,470 K)
Solubility in water	Insoluble

Structure
Crystal structure	Cubic

Related compounds
Other anions	Europium nitride Europium arsenide
Other cations	Samarium phosphide Gadolinium phosphide
- Except where otherwise noted, data are given for materials in their standard state (at 25 °C [77 °F], 100 kPa). Infobox references

Europium phosphide is an inorganic compound of europium and phosphorus with the chemical formula EuP. Other phosphides are also known.

== Preparation ==
Heating powdered europium and red phosphorus in an inert atmosphere or vacuum:

4 Eu + P_{4} → 4 EuP

Passing phosphine through a solution of europium in liquid ammonia:

Eu + 2PH_{3} → Eu(PH_{2})_{2} + H_{2}

Eu(PH_{2})_{2} is formed, which then decomposes to europium(III) phosphide and phosphine:

2Eu(PH_{2})_{2} → 2EuP + 2PH_{3} + H_{2}

== Properties ==
Europium(III) phosphide forms dark crystals which are stable in air and do not dissolve in water. Like sodium chloride, it crystallizes cubically in the space group Fm3m with cell parameter a = 575.5 nm with four formula units per unit cell. Europium(III) phosphide tends to form europium(II) oxide (EuO) in air, and pure EuP shows Van Vleck paramagnetism. The vapor pressure of EuP is 133-266.6 Pa at 1273 K.

Europium(III) phosphide actively reacts with nitric acid.

== Uses ==
The compound is a semiconductor used in high power, high frequency applications and in laser diodes.
