= YBP (disambiguation) =

YBP, or years before present, is a time scale used in scientific disciplines.

YBP or Ybp may also refer to:

- Yibin Wuliangye Airport, the IATA code YBP
- Ytterbium phosphide, the chemical formula YbP
- "Y.B.P." (song), featuring Bruiser Wolf
- Yellow Bird Project, a charity organization
