= Dysprosium monosulfide =

Names
- Other names Dysprosium(II) sulfide

Identifiers
CAS Number	12133-06-1
3D model (JSmol)	Interactive image
ChemSpider	73981758
- InChI: InChI=1S/Dy.S Key: XGUFXLYGPVJZIL-UHFFFAOYSA-N
- SMILES: [Dy].[S]

Properties
Chemical formula	DyS
Molar mass	194.56 g·mol^{−1}
Appearance	Crystals
Density	6.08 g/cm^{3}
Melting point	2,360 °C (4,280 °F; 2,630 K)

Related compounds
Related compounds	Samarium monosulfide
- Except where otherwise noted, data are given for materials in their standard state (at 25 °C [77 °F], 100 kPa). Infobox references

Dysprosium monosulfide is a binary inorganic compound of dysprosium and sulfur with the chemical formula DyS.

== Synthesis ==
Heating stoichiometric amounts of pure substances in an inert atmosphere:

Dy + S → DyS

== Physical properties ==
Dysprosium monosulfide forms crystals of cubic system, space group Fm3m, cell parameters a = 0.5591 nm, Z = 4, isomorphous with NaCl.

The compound melts congruently at a temperature of 2360 °C.
