= Gadolinium monosulfide =

Names
- Other names Gadolinium (II) sulfide

Identifiers
| CAS Number | 12134-74-6 |
| 3D model (JSmol) | Interactive image |
| ChemSpider | 73981756 |
| PubChem CID | 160355979 |
- InChI: InChI=1S/Gd.S Key: CHHGTOFGJMUJFT-UHFFFAOYSA-N
- SMILES: [Gd].[S]

Properties
| Chemical formula | GdS |
| Molar mass | 189.31 g·mol^{−1} |
| Appearance | Crystals |
| Density | 7.2 g/cm^{3} |
| Melting point | 2,300 °C (4,170 °F; 2,570 K) |

Structure
| Crystal structure | Cubic |

Related compounds
| Related compounds | Samarium monosulfide |
- Except where otherwise noted, data are given for materials in their standard state (at 25 °C [77 °F], 100 kPa). Infobox references

Gadolinium monosulfide is a binary inorganic compound of gadolinium and sulfur with the chemical formula GdS.

== Synthesis ==
Heating stoichiometric amounts of pure substances in an inert atmosphere:

Gd + S → GdS

It can be formed in a reaction between carbon, gadolinium(III) oxide, and gadolinium sesquisulphide:

Gd_{2}O_{3} + 2Gd_{2}S_{3} + 3C → 6GdS + 3CO

== Physical properties ==
Gadolinium monosulfide forms crystals of cubic system, space group Fm4m, unit cell parameter a = 0.5574 nm, Z = 4, isomorphous with NaCl.

GdS melts congruently at 2300 °C.
