= Terbium monosulfide =

Names
- Other names Terbium(II) sulfide

Identifiers
CAS Number	12143-71-4
3D model (JSmol)	Interactive image
- InChI: InChI=1S/S.Tb Key: PMXMFLRDTCOFIG-UHFFFAOYSA-N
- SMILES: [Tb].[S]

Properties
Chemical formula	STb
Molar mass	190.99 g·mol^{−1}
Appearance	Crystals
Density	7.41 g/cm^{3}

Related compounds
Related compounds	Samarium monosulfide
- Except where otherwise noted, data are given for materials in their standard state (at 25 °C [77 °F], 100 kPa). Infobox references

Terbium monosulfide is a binary inorganic compound of terbium and sulfur with the chemical formula TbS.

== Synthesis ==
Terbium monosulfide can be synthesised by heating stoichiometric amounts of pure substances in an inert atmosphere:

Tb + S → TbS

== Physical properties ==
Terbium monosulfide forms crystals of cubic system, space group Fm3m, isomorphous with NaCl.
