= II-VI =

II-VI may refer to:

- II-VI Incorporated, a manufacturer of optical materials and semiconductors
- II-VI semiconductor compound, a material composed of a metal from either group 2 or 12 of the periodic table and a nonmetal from group 16
