= Mackinawite =

Iron nickel sulfide mineral

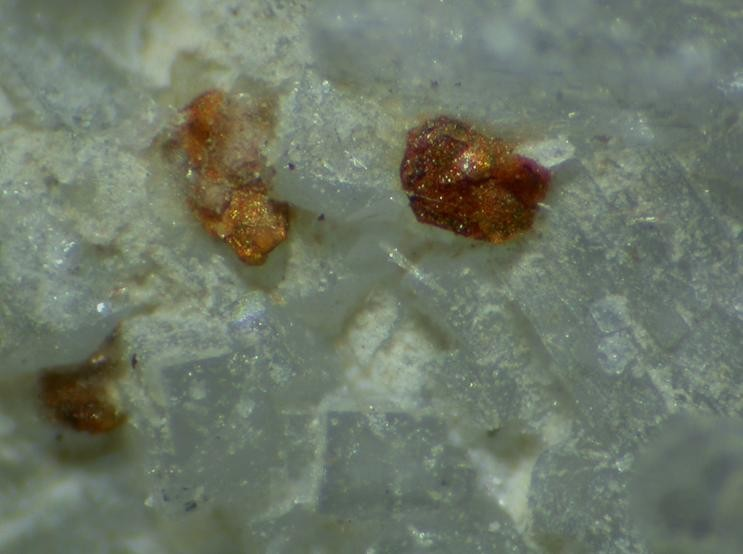

General
- Category: Sulfide mineral
- Formula: (Fe,Ni)_{1+x}S (where x=0 to 0.11)
- IMA symbol: Mkw
- Strunz classification: 2.CC.25
- Crystal system: Tetragonal
- Crystal class: Ditetragonal dipyramidal (4/mmm); H-M symbol: (4/m 2/m 2/m)
- Space group: P4/nmm
- Unit cell: a = 3.67 Å, c = 5.03 Å; Z = 2

Identification
- Formula mass: 85.42 g/mol
- Color: Bronze to white grey
- Crystal habit: As well-formed thin tabular crystals; massive, fine-feathery
- Cleavage: Perfect on {001}
- Mohs scale hardness: 2.5
- Luster: Metallic
- Streak: Black
- Diaphaneity: Opaque
- Specific gravity: 4.17

Mackinawite (/ˈmækɪnɔːaɪt/ MAK-i-naw-eyet) is an iron sulfide mineral, which can contain nickel substituting for iron(II), with as chemical formula (Fe,Ni)_{1+x}S (where x = 0 to 0.11). As indicated by its chemical composition, Fe_{(1+×)}, Fe is present with an excess of × over S, and it is thus an iron-rich, or a sulfur-deficient, iron monosulfide mineral. The mineral crystallizes in the tetragonal crystal system and has been described as a distorted, close packed, cubic array of S atoms with some of the gaps filled with Fe. Mackinawite occurs as opaque bronze to grey-white tabular crystals and anhedral masses. It has a Mohs hardness of 2.5 and a specific gravity of 4.17. It was first described in 1962 for an occurrence in the Mackinaw mine, Snohomish County, Washington for which it was named.

== Occurrence ==
Mackinawite occurs in serpentinized peridotites as a hydrothermal alteration product, in meteorites, and in association with chalcopyrite, cubanite, pentlandite, pyrrhotite, greigite, maucherite, and troilite. Mackinawite also occurs in reducing environments such as freshwater and marine sediments as a result of the metabolism of iron and sulfate-reducing bacteria.

In anoxic environments, mackinawite is formed by the reaction of HS^{−} with either Fe^{2+} ions or with Fe metal. Mackinawite is a metastable mineral that occurs predominantly as a poorly crystalline precipitate. After the initiation of precipitation, mackinawite can take up to 2 years to form at 25 °C. It has been reported that mackinawite can be stable for up to 16 weeks at temperatures up to 100 °C at pH values from 3–12. Laboratories have also produced synthetic mackinawite to study its formation using several different methods such as reacting sulfide with metallic iron or a solution of ferrous iron, growing sulfide reducing bacteria using Fe^{2+}, and electrochemically.

== Transformations in the environment ==
Depending on the redox conditions mackinawite can form more stable phases such as greigite and ultimately pyrite, an important mineral in anoxic aqueous settings that is preserved in sedimentary deposits, especially black shale. While it has been determined that mackinawite is a necessary precursor to pyrite, the pathway of iron sulfide mineral formation from aqueous species to solid mineral is still nebulous. Many iron sulfide minerals may exist in the transition between poorly ordered mackinawite and crystalline pyrite such as greigite, smithite, and pyrrhotite; however, studies have also indicated that pyrite formation from mackinawite can occur where oxidation has commenced and the sulfur present is in intermediate oxidation states (−1 to +6) and intermediate sulfur species such as elemental sulfur or polysulfides and surface oxidized monosulfide species, such as oxidized mackinawite or greigite are present.

== See also ==
- Glossary of meteoritics
