= Promethium monosulfide =

Identifiers
CAS Number	36387-73-2
3D model (JSmol)	Interactive image
- InChI: InChI=CVUHGGIVXPWRBM-UHFFFAOYSA-N Key: 1S/Pm.S
- SMILES: [Pm].[S]

Properties
Chemical formula	PmS
Molar mass	177 g·mol^{−1}
Appearance	crystals

Structure
Crystal structure	cubic

Related compounds
Related compounds	Lanthanum monosulfide

Hazards
- Occupational safety and health (OHS/OSH)
Main hazards	radioactive
- Except where otherwise noted, data are given for materials in their standard state (at 25 °C [77 °F], 100 kPa). Infobox references

Promethium monosulfide is a binary inorganic compound with the chemical formula PmS.

== Physical properties ==
The compound forms crystals structurally isomorphous with NaCl.
