= Ytterbium monotelluride =

Identifiers
CAS Number	12125-58-5
3D model (JSmol)	Interactive image
ECHA InfoCard	100.031.983
EC Number	235-194-8
PubChem CID	82928
CompTox Dashboard (EPA)	DTXSID701311611
- InChI: InChI=1S/Te.Yb Key: WNXKQTAPAWGMPP-UHFFFAOYSA-N
- SMILES: [Te].[Yb]

Properties
Chemical formula	TeYb
Molar mass	300.65 g·mol^{−1}
- Except where otherwise noted, data are given for materials in their standard state (at 25 °C [77 °F], 100 kPa). Infobox references

Ytterbium monotelluride is an inorganic compound, one of the tellurides of ytterbium, with the chemical formula YbTe.

== Preparation ==
Ytterbium monotelluride can be produced by the high-temperature reduction reaction of ytterbium(III) telluride (Yb_{2}Te_{3}), or by the reaction of ytterbium(III) chloride, tellurium and hydrogen:

YbCl_{3} + H_{2} → YbCl_{2} + 2 HCl
YbCl_{2} + H_{2} + Te → YbTe + 2 HCl

The thermal decomposition of [(py)_{2}Yb(μ-η^{2}-η^{2}-PhNNPh)(TePh)]_{2}·_{2}py will also produce ytterbium monotelluride, but at the same time, ytterbium(III) nitride will be produced.
