= Ytterbium(III) phosphide =

Names
- Other names Phosphanylidyneytterbium

Identifiers
CAS Number	12037-71-7
3D model (JSmol)	Interactive image
EC Number	234-865-2
- InChI: InChI=1S/P.Yb Key: SYXPIBUUJXGISU-UHFFFAOYSA-N
- SMILES: P#[Yb]

Properties
Chemical formula	PYb
Molar mass	204.01
Appearance	Black crystals
Density	6.94 g/cm^{3}
Solubility in water	Insoluble

Structure
Crystal structure	Cubic

Related compounds
Other anions	Ytterbium nitride Ytterbium arsenide Ytterbium antimonide
Other cations	Thulium phosphide Lutetium phosphide
- Except where otherwise noted, data are given for materials in their standard state (at 25 °C [77 °F], 100 kPa). Infobox references

Ytterbium(III) phosphide is an inorganic compound of ytterbium and phosphorus with the chemical formula YbP. This is one of the phosphides of ytterbium.

== Synthesis ==
Ytterbium and phosphine react in liquid ammonia to form Yb(PH_{2})_{2}·5NH_{3}, which can be decomposed to obtain ytterbium(III) phosphide:

Yb(PH_{2})_{2}•5NH_{3} → Yb(PH_{2})_{2} + 5NH_{3}

2Yb(PH_{2})_{2} → YbP + 2PH_{3} + H_{2}

== Physical properties ==
Ytterbium(III) phosphide decomposes at or above 550 °C:

12 YbP → 4 Yb_{3}P_{2} + P_{4}

It is soluble in hydrochloric acid, nitric acid, and aqua regia.

The compound forms black crystals of a cubic system, space group Fm3m.

== Uses ==
The ytterbium(III) phosphide compound is a semiconductor used in high power, high frequency applications and in laser and other photo diodes.
