= Lutetium phosphide =

Names
- Other names Phosphanylidynelutetium

Identifiers
CAS Number	12032-05-2
3D model (JSmol)	Interactive image
ChemSpider	32816392
ECHA InfoCard	100.031.588
EC Number	234-761-7
PubChem CID	82822
CompTox Dashboard (EPA)	DTXSID501313411
- InChI: InChI=1S/Lu.P Key: PQFNNANPDJBCCR-UHFFFAOYSA-N
- SMILES: [Lu+3].[P-3]

Properties
Chemical formula	LuP
Molar mass	205.94
Appearance	Dark crystals
Density	8,1
Solubility in water	Insoluble

Structure
Crystal structure	cubic

Related compounds
Other anions	Lutetium nitride Lutetium arsenide Lutetium antimonide Lutetium bismuthide
Other cations	Ytterbium phosphide
- Except where otherwise noted, data are given for materials in their standard state (at 25 °C [77 °F], 100 kPa). Infobox references

Lutetium phosphide is an inorganic compound of lutetium and phosphorus with the chemical formula LuP. The compound forms dark crystals, does not dissolve in water.

== Synthesis ==
Heating powdered lutetium and red phosphorus in an inert atmosphere or vacuum:

4 Lu + P_{4} → 4 LuP

It can also be formed in the reaction of lutetium and phosphine.

== Physical properties ==
Lutetium phosphide forms dark cubic crystals, space group Fm3̅m, cell parameters a = 0.5533 nm, with formulas per unit cell Z = 4.

It is stable in air, does not dissolve in water and reacts actively with nitric acid.

== Uses ==
The compound is a semiconductor used in high power, high-frequency applications, and in laser diodes.

Also used in gamma radiation detectors due to its ability to absorb radiation.
