= Magnesium selenide =

Names
- Systematic IUPAC name Magnesium selenide

Identifiers
CAS Number	1313-04-8
3D model (JSmol)	Interactive image
ChemSpider	66597
ECHA InfoCard	100.013.820
EC Number	215-201-0
PubChem CID	73969
UNII	N7813M82QS
CompTox Dashboard (EPA)	DTXSID1061659
- InChI: InChI=1S/Mg.Se/q+2;-2 Key: AZUPEYZKABXNLR-UHFFFAOYSA-N
- SMILES: [Mg+2].[Se-2]

Properties
Chemical formula	MgSe
Molar mass	103.27 g/mol
Density	4.21 g/cm^{3} (rock-salt); 3.32 g/cm^{3} (zincblende)
Melting point	1,290 °C; 2,350 °F; 1,560 K
Band gap	3.9 eV (rock-salt) (300 K); 4.0 eV (zincblende) (300 K)

Structure
Crystal structure	Rock-salt (cubic); Zincblende (cubic); Wurtzite (hexagonal)
Lattice constant	a = 0.55 nm (rock-salt) a = 0.59 nm (zincblende) a = 0.415 nm, c = 0.672 nm (wurtzite)

Related compounds
Other anions	Magnesium oxide Magnesium sulfide Magnesium telluride
Other cations	Cadmium selenide Mercury selenide Zinc selenide
Related compounds	Magnesium zinc selenide Cadmium magnesium selenide
- Except where otherwise noted, data are given for materials in their standard state (at 25 °C [77 °F], 100 kPa). Infobox references

Magnesium selenide is an inorganic compound with the chemical formula MgSe. It contains magnesium and selenium in a 1:1 ratio. It belongs to the II-VI family of semiconductor compounds.

== Structure ==
Three crystal structures for MgSe have been experimentally characterized. The rock-salt structure is considered to be the most stable crystal structure that has been observed in bulk samples of MgSe, and a cubic lattice constant of 0.55 nm was deduced for this structure. Although attempts at preparing pure zincblende MgSe have been unsuccessful, the lattice constant of zincblende MgSe has been extrapolated from epitaxial thin films of zincblende Mg_{x}Zn_{1−x}S_{y}Se_{1−x} and Mg_{x}Zn_{1−x}Se grown on gallium arsenide, the latter of which was prepared with a high magnesium content (up to 95% Mg, i.e., Mg_{0.95}Zn_{0.05}Se). There is good agreement between these and other extrapolations that the lattice constant of pure zincblende MgSe is 0.59 nm. The wurtzite structure of MgSe has been observed, but it is unstable and slowly converts to the rock-salt structure.

NiAs- and FeSi-type crystal structures of MgSe are predicted to form by subjecting the rock-salt crystal structure to extremely high pressures.

== Electronic properties ==
Both rock-salt and zincblende MgSe are semiconductors. On the basis of different extrapolations, a room temperature bandgap of 4.0 eV has been recommended for zincblende MgSe. A room temperature bandgap of 3.9 eV was determined for rock-salt MgSe.

== Preparation ==
Thin films of amorphous, wurtzite and rock-salt MgSe have been prepared by vacuum deposition of Mg and Se at cryogenic temperatures, followed by heating and annealing. Compound semiconductor alloys of MgSe, such as Mg_{x}Zn_{1−x}Se, have been prepared by molecular beam epitaxy.

== Reactions ==
Samples of pure MgSe and Mg-rich Mg_{x}Zn_{1−x}Se (x > 0.7) readily react with water and oxidize in air.
