= Plutonium(III) arsenide =

Names
- Other names Plutonium monoarsenide

Identifiers
CAS Number	12006-02-9
3D model (JSmol)	Interactive image
PubChem CID	129627908
- InChI: InChI=1S/As.Pu Key: IFUISAQYPYTWOE-UHFFFAOYSA-N
- SMILES: [As]#[Pu]

Properties
Chemical formula	AsPu
Molar mass	318,92
Appearance	Black or dark-gray crystals
Density	10.39 g/cm^{3}
Melting point	2,420 °C (4,390 °F; 2,690 K)

Structure
Crystal structure	Cubic
- Except where otherwise noted, data are given for materials in their standard state (at 25 °C [77 °F], 100 kPa). Infobox references

Plutonium arsenide is a binary inorganic compound of plutonium and arsenic with the formula PuAs.

== Synthesis ==
Fusion of stoichiometric amounts of pure substances in a vacuum or helium atmosphere. The reaction is exothermic:

Pu + As → PuAs

Passing arsine through heated plutonium hydride:

2PuH_{2} + 2AsH_{3} → 2PuAs + 5H_{2}

== Physical properties ==
Plutonium arsenide forms black or dark gray crystals of a cubic system, space group Fm3m, cell parameters a = 0.5855 nm, Z = 4, structure of the NaCl-type.

At high pressure (about 35 GPa), a phase transition occurs to a structure of the CsCl-type.

At a temperature of 129 K, PuAs transforms into a ferromagnetic state.
