= Praseodymium monosulfide =

Names
- IUPAC name sulfanylidenepraseodymium(1+)
- Other names Praseodymium(II) sulfide

Identifiers
CAS Number	12038-06-1
3D model (JSmol)	Interactive image
- InChI: InChI=1S/Pr.S/q+2;-2 Key: AESILDUJSAGKHP-UHFFFAOYSA-N
- SMILES: [S-2].[Pr+2]

Properties
Chemical formula	PrS
Molar mass	172.97 g·mol^{−1}
Appearance	Crystalline solid
Density	6.1 g/cm^{3}
Melting point	2,230 °C (4,050 °F; 2,500 K)

Related compounds
Related compounds	Samarium monosulfide
- Except where otherwise noted, data are given for materials in their standard state (at 25 °C [77 °F], 100 kPa). Infobox references

Praseodymium monosulfide is a binary inorganic chemical compound of praseodymium metal and sulfur with the chemical formula PrS.

== Synthesis ==
Fusion of stoichiometric amounts of pure substances:

Pr + S → PrS

== Physical properties ==
Praseodymium monosulfide forms crystals of the cubic system, space group Fm3m, cell parameters a = 0.5727 nm, Z = 4, structurally isomorphous with NaCl.

The compound melts at a temperature of 2230 °C and has a homogeneity range of PrS_{0.75–1}.
