= Neptunium diarsenide =

Identifiers
CAS Number	39350-10-2
3D model (JSmol)	Interactive image
- InChI: InChI=1S/As2.Np/c1-2;/q-4;+4 Key: QGMNOYVKXOFBOP-UHFFFAOYSA-N
- SMILES: [As-2][As-2].[Np+4]

Properties
Chemical formula	NpAs_{2}
Molar mass	386.84
Appearance	Crystals

Related compounds
Related compounds	Neptunium arsenide
- Except where otherwise noted, data are given for materials in their standard state (at 25 °C [77 °F], 100 kPa). Infobox references

Neptunium diarsenide is a binary inorganic compound of neptunium and arsenic with the chemical formula NpAs_{2}. The compound forms crystals.

== Synthesis ==
Heating stoichiometric amounts of neptunium hydride and arsenic:

$$\mathsf{ NpH_x + 2As \ \xrightarrow{450^oC}\ NpAs_2 + (x/2)H_2 }$$

== Physical properties ==
Neptunium diarsenide forms crystals of the tetragonal system, space group P4/nmm, cell parameters a = 0.3958 nm, c = 0.8098 nm.
