= Praseodymium selenide =

Praseodymium selenide may refer to:

- Praseodymium monoselenide, PrSe
- Praseodymium sesquiselenide, Pr_{2}Se_{3}
- Praseodymium diselenide, PrSe_{2}
