= Neodymium monosulfide =

Names
- Other names Neodymium(II) sulfide

Identifiers
CAS Number	12035-22-2
3D model (JSmol)	Interactive image
- InChI: InChI=1S/Nd.S Key: FPHIACORVTULTF-UHFFFAOYSA-N
- SMILES: [Nd].[S]

Properties
Chemical formula	NdS
Molar mass	176.30 g·mol^{−1}
Appearance	crystals
Density	6.15 g/cm^{3}
Melting point	2,200 °C (3,990 °F; 2,470 K)

Related compounds
Related compounds	Cerium monosulfide
- Except where otherwise noted, data are given for materials in their standard state (at 25 °C [77 °F], 100 kPa). Infobox references

Neodymium(II) sulfide is a binary inorganic chemical compound of Neodymium metal and sulfur with the chemical formula NdS.

== Synthesis ==
Fusion of stoichiometric amounts of pure substances:

Nd + S → NdS

== Physical properties ==
Neodymium monosulfide forms crystals of the cubic system, space group Fm3m, cell parameter a = 0.5691 nm, Z = 4.
