= Neodymium phosphide =

Names
- Other names Neodymium monophosphide

Identifiers
CAS Number	30985-23-0
3D model (JSmol)	Interactive image
ChemSpider	148008
ECHA InfoCard	100.045.819
EC Number	250-416-3
PubChem CID	169224
CompTox Dashboard (EPA)	DTXSID20300377
- InChI: InChI=1S/Nd.P Key: NCHWJDCPSSHPBO-UHFFFAOYSA-N
- SMILES: [Nd]#P

Properties
Chemical formula	NdP
Molar mass	175.3
Appearance	Crystals
Density	5.68 g/cm^{3}
Melting point	2,500 °C (4,530 °F; 2,770 K)

Structure
Crystal structure	cubic

Related compounds
Other anions	Neodymium nitride Neodymium arsenide Neodymium antimonide Neodymium bismuthide
Other cations	Praseodymium phosphide Samarium phosphide
- Except where otherwise noted, data are given for materials in their standard state (at 25 °C [77 °F], 100 kPa). Infobox references

Neodymium phosphide is an inorganic compound of neodymium and phosphorus with the chemical formula NdP.

== Preparation ==
Neodymium phosphide can be obtained by reacting neodymium and phosphorus in a stoichiometric ratio:

4 Nd + P_{4} → 4 NdP

== Physical properties ==
Neodymium phosphide forms cubic crystals, space group Fm3̅m, cell parameters a = 0.5838 nm, Z = 4.

== Uses ==
The compound is a semiconductor used in high power, high frequency applications, and in laser diodes.
