= Lanthanum monosulfide =

Names
- IUPAC name lanthanum; sulfide

Identifiers
CAS Number	12031-30-0
3D model (JSmol)	Interactive image
ChemSpider	128947726
- InChI: InChI=1S/La.S/q+2;-2 Key: GTXCIJGFTBRPNK-UHFFFAOYSA-N
- SMILES: [S-2].[La+2]

Properties
Chemical formula	LaS
Molar mass	170.97 g·mol^{−1}
Appearance	golden crystals
Density	5.61 g/cm^{3}
Melting point	2,300 °C (4,170 °F; 2,570 K)

Structure
Crystal structure	Cubic

Related compounds
Related compounds	Samarium monosulfide

Hazards
- GHS labelling
Pictograms	(GHS07: Exclamation mark)
Signal word	Warning
- Except where otherwise noted, data are given for materials in their standard state (at 25 °C [77 °F], 100 kPa). Infobox references

Lanthanum monosulfide is a binary inorganic chemical compound of lanthanum metal and sulfur with the chemical formula LaS.

== Synthesis ==
Lanthanum monosulfide can be prepared from the effect of sulfur vapor on metallic lanthanum:

La + S → LaS

It can also be prepared from the reduction of La_{2}S_{3} with metallic La.

== Physical properties ==
Lanthanum monosulfide forms golden crystals of the cubic system, space group Fm3m, cell parameters a = 0.586 nm, Z = 4, structurally isomorphous with NaCl.
