= Uranium monosulfide =

Identifiers
CAS Number	12039-11-1
3D model (JSmol)	Interactive image
- InChI: InChI=1S/S.U Key: BFEBVEVTVKJYGD-UHFFFAOYSA-N
- SMILES: [U].[S]

Properties
Chemical formula	US
Molar mass	270.095 g/mol
Melting point	2460 °C

Structure
Crystal structure	NaCl type (cubic)
Space group	Fm3̅m (No. 225)
Lattice constant	a = 548.66 pm
Formula units (Z)	4

Related compounds
Other anions	Uranium carbide Uranium monophosphide
Related compounds	Uranium disulfide
- Except where otherwise noted, data are given for materials in their standard state (at 25 °C [77 °F], 100 kPa). Infobox references

Uranium monosulfide (US) is an inorganic chemical compound of uranium and sulfur. It is produced by combining uranium metal powder with hydrogen sulfide to form uranium disulfide, followed by sulfur loss during high-temperature, vacuum annealing.

Magnetically, the compound is paramagnetic at room temperature, with a Curie Temperature of 180 K. It has the largest known magnetocrystalline anisotropy of any cubic system.
