= Gadolinium phosphide =

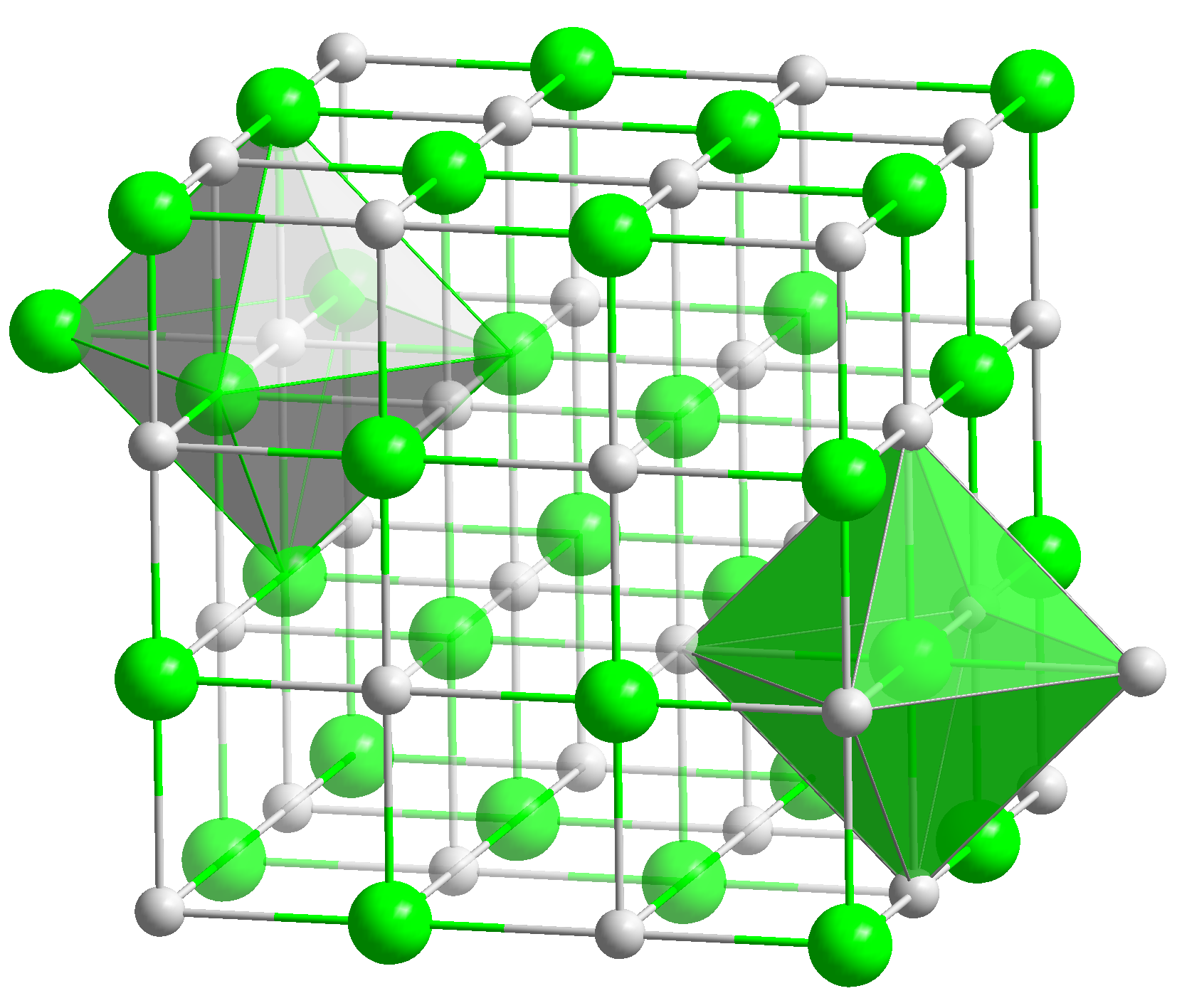

Names
- Other names Gadolinium monophosphide, phosphanylidynegadolinium

Identifiers
CAS Number	12024-79-2
3D model (JSmol)	Interactive image
ChemSpider	74731
EC Number	234-696-4
PubChem CID	82814
- InChI: InChI=1S/Gd.P Key: ZBYBPUTWLXQDMS-UHFFFAOYSA-N
- SMILES: [Gd].[P]

Properties
Chemical formula	GdP
Molar mass	188.22 g·mol^{−1}
Appearance	crystals
Density	6.68 g/cm^{3}

Structure
Crystal structure	Cubic
Space group	Fm3m

Related compounds
Other anions	Gadolinium nitride Gadolinium arsenide Gadolinium antimonide Gadolinium bismuthide
Other cations	Europium phosphide Terbium phosphide
- Except where otherwise noted, data are given for materials in their standard state (at 25 °C [77 °F], 100 kPa). Infobox references

Gadolinium phosphide is an inorganic compound of gadolinium and phosphorus with the chemical formula GdP.

== Synthesis ==
Gadolinium phosphide can be obtained by reacting gadolinium and phosphorus at high temperature, and single crystals can be obtained by mineralization.

4 Gd + P_{4} → 4 GdP

== Physical properties ==
GdP has a NaCl-structure and transforms to a CsCl-structure at 40 GPa.

GdP forms crystals of a cubic system, space group Fm3m.

Gadolinium phosphide is antiferromagnetic.

== Uses ==
The compound is a semiconductor used in high power, high frequency applications and in laser diode.
