= Europium(III) selenide =

Identifiers
CAS Number	12381-91-8
3D model (JSmol)	Interactive image
PubChem CID	22272067
- InChI: InChI=1S/2Eu.3Se/q2*+3;3*-2 Key: GOYYHDCMYCORSU-UHFFFAOYSA-N
- SMILES: [Se-2].[Se-2].[Se-2].[Eu+3].[Eu+3]

Properties
Chemical formula	Eu_{2}Se_{3}
Molar mass	540.841 g·mol^{−1}
- Except where otherwise noted, data are given for materials in their standard state (at 25 °C [77 °F], 100 kPa). Infobox references

Europium(III) selenide is an inorganic compound with the chemical formula Eu_{2}Se_{3}. It is one of the selenides of europium. It can be obtained by the reaction of selenium and europium at high temperature. It co-melts with germanium diselenide to form Eu_{2}GeSe_{5} and Eu_{2}Ge_{2}Se_{7}. It reacts with uranium and uranium diselenide at high temperature to obtain EuU_{2}Se_{5}.
