= Plutonium(III) phosphide =

Plutonium compound

Names
- Other names Plutonium monophosphide

Identifiers
| CAS Number | 12680-25-0 |
| 3D model (JSmol) | Interactive image |
- InChI: InChI=1S/P.Pu Key: PLULROOTRMPUIM-UHFFFAOYSA-N
- SMILES: [Pu]#[P]

Properties
| Chemical formula | PPu |
| Molar mass | 274.97 |
| Appearance | Black crystals |
| Density | 10.08 g/cm^{3} |

Structure
| Crystal structure | Cubic |
- Except where otherwise noted, data are given for materials in their standard state (at 25 °C [77 °F], 100 kPa). Infobox references

Plutonium(III) phosphide is a binary inorganic compound of plutonium and phosphorus with the formula PuP.

== Synthesis ==
Fusion of excess phosphorus and powdered plutonium, followed by distillation of unreacted phosphorus:

4 Pu + P_{4} → 4 PuP

Passing phosphine through heated plutonium hydride:

PuH_{3} + PH_{3} → PuP + 3 H_{2}

== Physical properties ==
Plutonium(III) phosphide forms black crystals of a cubic system, space group Fm3m, cell parameters a = 0.5660 nm, Z = 4, structure of the NaCl type.
