= Uranium disulfide =

Identifiers
CAS Number	12039-14-4
3D model (JSmol)	Interactive image
ChemSpider	23349340
ECHA InfoCard	100.031.700
EC Number	234-884-6
PubChem CID	131700999
CompTox Dashboard (EPA)	DTXSID2065204
- InChI: InChI=1S/2S.U/q2*-2;+4 Key: OYHHCKFHGQELGK-UHFFFAOYSA-N
- SMILES: [S-2].[S-2].[U+4]

Properties
Chemical formula	US_{2}
Molar mass	302.160 g/mol
Appearance	Black crystals

Structure
Crystal structure	Tetragonal (α-US_{2})
Space group	P4/ncc (No. 130)
Lattice constant	a = 1029.3 pm, c = 637.4 pm
- Except where otherwise noted, data are given for materials in their standard state (at 25 °C [77 °F], 100 kPa). Infobox references

Uranium disulfide is an inorganic chemical compound of uranium in oxidation state +4 and sulfur in oxidation state −2. It is radioactive and appears in the form of black crystals.

Uranium disulfide has two allotropic forms: α-uranium disulfide, which is stable above the transition temperature (about 1350 °C) and metastable below it, and β-uranium disulfide which is stable below this temperature. The tetragonal crystal structure of α-US_{2} is identical to α-USe_{2}.

Uranium disulfide can be synthesized by reduction of gaseous hydrogen sulfide with uranium metal powder at elevated temperatures.
