= Uranium monophosphide =

Identifiers
CAS Number	12037-69-3
3D model (JSmol)	Interactive image
ChemSpider	103867623
PubChem CID	22899254
- InChI: InChI=1S/P.U Key: UTHMXILCQVBCDM-UHFFFAOYSA-N
- SMILES: P#[U]

Properties
Chemical formula	UP
Molar mass	272.0625 g/mol
Density	10.23 g/cm^{3}
Melting point	2,600 °C (4,710 °F; 2,870 K)

Structure
Crystal structure	Face-centered cubic
Lattice constant	a = 0.5578 nm
- Except where otherwise noted, data are given for materials in their standard state (at 25 °C [77 °F], 100 kPa). Infobox references

Uranium monophosphide is a compound of uranium and phosphorus, synthesized from heating metal uranium and white phosphorus:

4 U + P_{4} → 4 UP

It is a potential nuclear fuel.

In air, a thin glassy surface layer protects the compound from oxidation; over the course of months after synthesis, this layer develops a metallic sheen.
