= Gallium palladide =

Names
- Preferred IUPAC name Gallium palladide

Identifiers
| CAS Number | 59125-32-5 |
| 3D model (JSmol) | Interactive image |
| ChemSpider | 57529037 |
| PubChem CID | 15162368 |
| CompTox Dashboard (EPA) | DTXSID90851987 |
- InChI: InChI=1S/Ga.Pd Key: OZTVKGRKOWIYRK-UHFFFAOYSA-N
- SMILES: [Ga].[Pd]

Properties
| Chemical formula | GaPd |
| Molar mass | 176.14 g·mol^{−1} |

Structure
| Crystal structure | Iron monosilicide (cubic) |
| Space group | P2_{1}3 (No. 198) |
| Lattice constant | a = 489.695 pm |
- Except where otherwise noted, data are given for materials in their standard state (at 25 °C [77 °F], 100 kPa). Infobox references

Gallium palladide (GaPd or PdGa) is an intermetallic combination of gallium and palladium. It has the iron monosilicide crystal structure. The compound has been suggested as an improved catalyst for hydrogenation reactions. In principle, gallium palladide can be a more selective catalyst since unlike substituted compounds, the palladium atoms are spaced out in a regular crystal structure rather than randomly.
