= Lanthanum nitride =

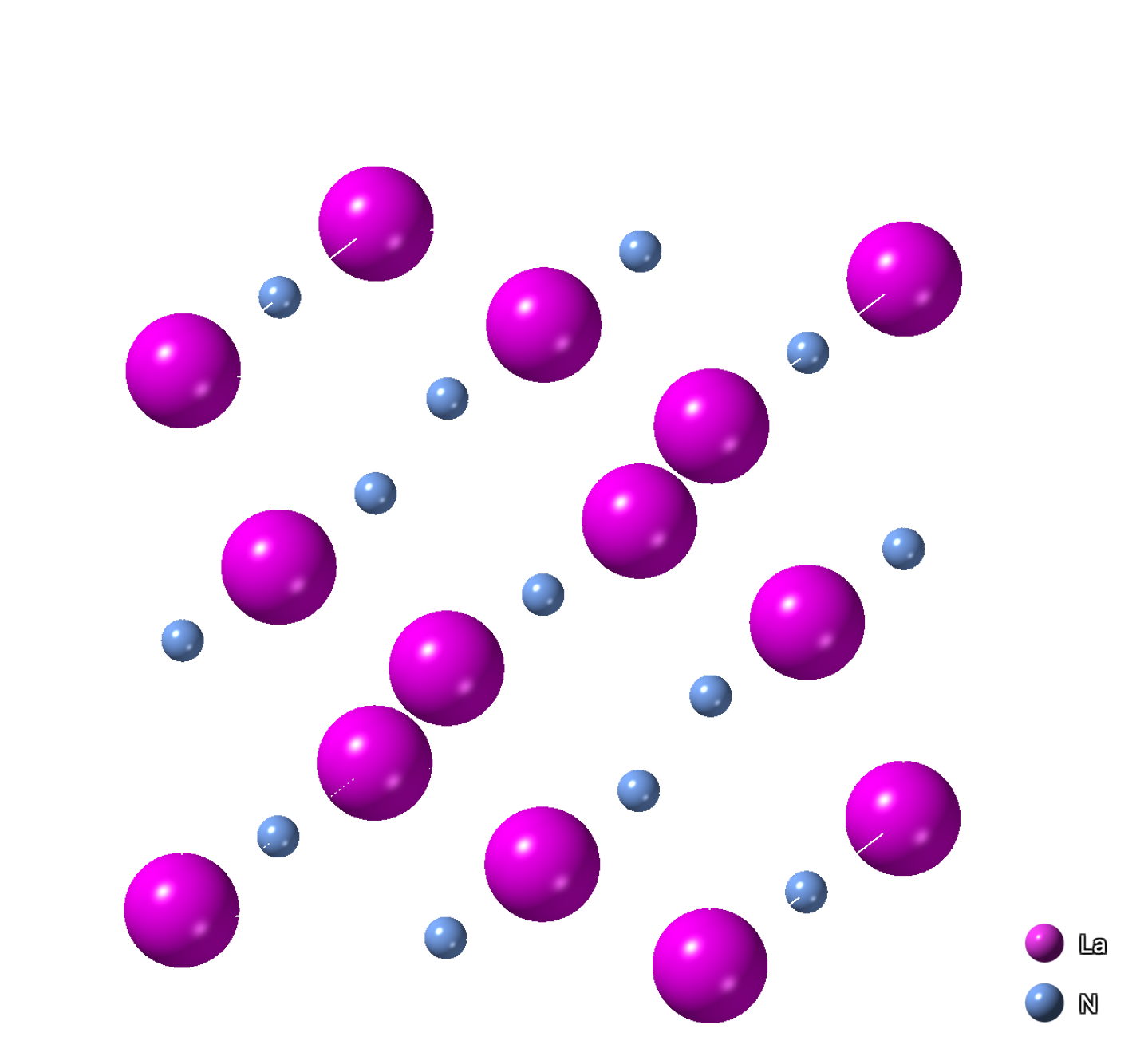

Names
- IUPAC name Azanylidynelanthanum
- Other names Lanthanum mononitride, lanthanum(III) nitride

Identifiers
CAS Number	25764-10-7
3D model (JSmol)	Interactive image
ChemSpider	105115
ECHA InfoCard	100.042.936
EC Number	247-245-1
PubChem CID	117627
CompTox Dashboard (EPA)	DTXSID9067140
- InChI: InChI=1S/La.N Key: QCLQZCOGUCNIOC-UHFFFAOYSA-N
- SMILES: [La+3].[N-3]

Properties
Chemical formula	LaN
Molar mass	152.912 g·mol^{−1}
Appearance	Black powder
Density	6.73 g/cm^{3}
Melting point	2,450 °C (4,440 °F; 2,720 K)
Solubility in water	Insoluble

Hazards
- GHS labelling
Pictograms	(GHS07: Exclamation mark)
Signal word	Warning
Hazard statements	H315, H319, H335
Precautionary statements	P264, P271, P280, P302, P304, P305, P312, P313, P332, P338, P340, P351, P352, P362, P501
- Except where otherwise noted, data are given for materials in their standard state (at 25 °C [77 °F], 100 kPa). Infobox references

Lanthanum nitride is a binary inorganic compound of lanthanum and nitride with the chemical formula LaN.

== Preparation ==
Lanthanum nitride can be prepared from the reaction of nitrogen and lanthanum trihydride:

2 LaH_{3} + N_{2} → 2 LaN + 3 H_{2}

It can also be prepared from the reaction of ammonia and lanthanum trihydride:

LaH_{3} + NH_{3} → LaN + 3 H_{2}

The reaction of nitrogen and lanthanum amalgam can also work:

La + ½ N_{2} → LaN (1000 - 1400 °C)

Ammonia is more reactive than N_{2} gas, so the synthesis works at lower temperatures:

La + NH_{3} → LaN + 1.5 H_{2} (700 °C)

== Physical properties ==
Lanthanum nitride forms black powder that is insoluble in water. Their crystals are of the cubic system with the Fm3m space group.

It is paramagnetic.

== Chemical properties ==
Lanthanum nitride reacts with water and moisture from the air:

LaN + 3 H_{2}O → La(OH)_{3} + NH_{3}

It reacts with acids:

LaN + 4 HCl → LaCl_{3} + NH_{4}Cl

== Uses ==
LaN is used as a LED material, magnetic material, and in semiconductors, refractory materials, dyes, and catalysts.
