= Barium selenide =

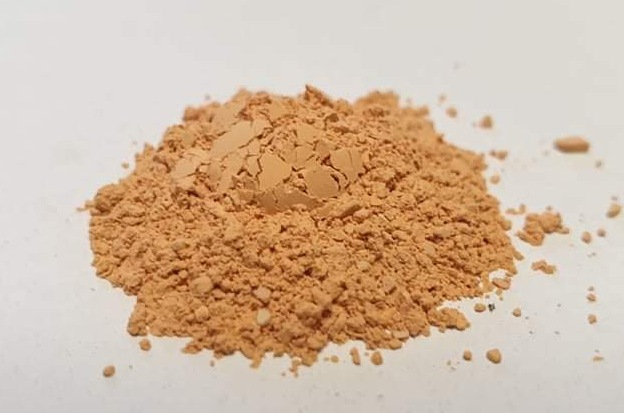

Identifiers
CAS Number	1304-39-8
3D model (JSmol)	Interactive image
ChemSpider	8010098
ECHA InfoCard	100.013.755
EC Number	215-130-5
PubChem CID	9834377
UNII	42Z7S6FJNV
CompTox Dashboard (EPA)	DTXSID7061649
- InChI: InChI=1S/Ba.Se/q+2;-2 Key: RJWLRCHYHHXJLX-UHFFFAOYSA-N
- SMILES: [Se-2].[Ba+2]

Properties
Chemical formula	BaSe
Molar mass	216.298 g·mol^{−1}
Appearance	white solid

Structure
Crystal structure	NaCl type (cubic)
Space group	Fm3̅m (No. 225)
Lattice constant	a = 662.9 pm
Formula units (Z)	4

Hazards
- GHS labelling
Pictograms	(GHS06: Toxic) (GHS08: Health hazard) (GHS09: Environmental hazard)
Signal word	Danger
Hazard statements	H301, H331, H373, H410
- Except where otherwise noted, data are given for materials in their standard state (at 25 °C [77 °F], 100 kPa). Infobox references

Barium selenide is an inorganic compound, with the chemical formula of BaSe. It is a white solid although typically samples are colored owing to the effects of air oxidation.

BaSe has the lowest energy band gap among alkaline earth chalcogenides.

== Preparation ==
Barium selenide can be obtained by the reduction of barium selenate in hydrogen flow:.

BaSeO_{4} + 4 H_{2} → BaSe + 4 H_{2}O

It can also be obtained by reacting selenium with barium carbonate or barium oxide at high temperature:

2 BaCO_{3} + 5 Se → 2 BaSe + 3 SeO_{2} + CO_{2}

== Related compounds ==
Barium can also forms a series of polyselenide compounds, such as Ba_{2}Se_{3}, BaSe_{2} and BaSe_{3}.
