= Lutetium nitride =

Names
- IUPAC name Azanylidynelutetium
- Other names Lutetium mononitride

Identifiers
CAS Number	12125-25-6
3D model (JSmol)	Interactive image
ChemSpider	74826
ECHA InfoCard	100.031.980
EC Number	235-191-1
PubChem CID	82927
CompTox Dashboard (EPA)	DTXSID801014280
- InChI: InChI=1S/Lu.N Key: DPDGELPGCPPHSN-UHFFFAOYSA-N
- SMILES: [Lu]#N

Properties
Chemical formula	LuN
Molar mass	188.974 g·mol^{−1}
Appearance	solid
Density	11.66 g/cm^{3}
- Except where otherwise noted, data are given for materials in their standard state (at 25 °C [77 °F], 100 kPa). Infobox references

Lutetium nitride is a binary inorganic compound of lutetium and nitrogen with the chemical formula LuN.

== Preparation ==
Lutetium nitride can be prepared from direct nitridation of lutetium at 1600 °C:

2Lu + N_{2} → 2LuN

== Physical properties ==
Lutetium nitride crystalizes with cubic crystal system of the space group of F3m3.
