= Samarium(III) arsenide =

Names
- Other names samarium(III) arsenide, arsanylidynesamarium

Identifiers
CAS Number	12255-39-9
3D model (JSmol)	Interactive image
ChemSpider	74886
ECHA InfoCard	100.032.266
EC Number	235-506-2
PubChem CID	83002
- InChI: InChI=1S/As.Sm Key: GSRNJUWQQSVPNG-UHFFFAOYSA-N
- SMILES: [As]#[Sm]

Properties
Chemical formula	SmAs
Molar mass	225.28
Appearance	Crystals
Density	7.2 g/cm^{3}
Melting point	2,257 °C (4,095 °F; 2,530 K)

Related compounds
Related compounds	Neptunium arsenide
- Except where otherwise noted, data are given for materials in their standard state (at 25 °C [77 °F], 100 kPa). Infobox references

Samarium(III) arsenide is a binary inorganic compound of samarium and arsenic with the chemical formula SmAs.

== Synthesis ==
Samarium arsenide can be synthesised by heating of pure substances in vacuum:

Sm + As → SmAs

== Physical properties ==
Samarium arsenide forms crystals of a cubic system, space group Fm3m, cell parameters a = 0.5921 nm, Z = 4, of NaCl-structure.

The compound melts congruently at 2257 °C.

== Uses ==
SmAs is used as a semiconductor and in photo optic applications.
