= Cerium monoselenide =

Identifiers
CAS Number	12014-83-4
3D model (JSmol)	Interactive image
PubChem CID	170843467
- InChI: InChI=1S/Ce.Se Key: LNUVLVYMHRNGRT-UHFFFAOYSA-N
- SMILES: [Se].[Ce]

Properties
Chemical formula	CeSe
Appearance	purple solid

Structure
Crystal structure	NaCl-type (cubic)
Space group	Fm3̅m (No. 225)

Related compounds
Other anions	Cerium monosulfide Cerium monotelluride
Related compounds	Cerium selenide
- Except where otherwise noted, data are given for materials in their standard state (at 25 °C [77 °F], 100 kPa). Infobox references

Cerium monoselenide is an inorganic compound with the chemical formula CeSe. It exists in the form of Ce^{3+}Se^{2−}(e^{−}).

== Preparation ==
Cerium monoselenide can be obtained by reducing cerium selenide with metallic sodium at 600 °C (or calcium at 1000 °C):

Ce_{2}Se_{3} + 2Na → 2CeSe + Na_{2}Se

The reduction of cerium selenide by cerium dihydride can also produce cerium monoselenide:

Ce_{2}Se_{3} + CeH_{2} → 3 CeSe + H_{2}↑

== Properties ==
Like many other rare earth monochalcogenides, Cerium monoselenide has metallic-type electrical conductivity and a NaCl-type crystal structure.
