= Samarium monochalcogenides =

Compounds containing one samarium and one chalcogen atom

Samarium monochalcogenides are chemical compounds with the composition SmX, where Sm stands for the lanthanide element samarium and X denotes any one of three chalcogen elements, sulfur, selenium or tellurium, resulting in the compounds SmS, SmSe or SmTe. In these compounds, samarium formally exhibits oxidation state +2, whereas it usually assumes the +3 state, resulting in chalcogenides with the chemical formula Sm_{2}X_{3}.

== Synthesis ==
Single crystals or polycrystals of samarium monochalcogenides can be obtained by reacting the metal with sulfur, selenium or tellurium vapors at high temperature. Thin films can be obtained by magnetron sputtering or electron beam physical vapor deposition, that is bombardment of samarium metal target with electrons in and appropriate gas atmosphere (e.g. hydrogen disulfide for SmS).

== Properties ==
Formula	Lattice constant nm	Resistivity Ohm·cm	Band gap eV
SmS	0.597	0.001–0.01	0.15
SmSe	0.620	~3000	0.45
SmTe	0.6594	~1000	0.65

Samarium monochalcogenides are black semiconducting solids with rock-salt cubic crystal structure. Application of moderate hydrostatic pressure converts them into metals. Whereas the transition is continuous and occurs at about 45 and 60 kbar in SmSe and SmTe, respectively, it is abrupt in SmS and requires only 6.5 kbar. Similar effect is observed in monochalcogenides of another lanthanide, thulium. This results in spectacular change in color from black to golden yellow when scratching or mechanically polishing SmS. The transition does not change the crystal structure, but there is a sharp decrease (about 15%) in the crystal volume. A hysteresis is observed, that is when the pressure is released, SmS returns to semiconducting state at much lower pressure of about 0.5 kbar.

Not only color and electrical conductivity, but also other properties change in samarium monochalcogenides with increasing pressure. Their metallic behavior results from the decreasing band gap, which amounts at zero pressure to 0.15, 0.45 and 0.65 eV in SmS, SmSe and SmTe, respectively. At the transition pressure (6.5 kbar in SmS) the gap is still finite and the low resistivity originates from thermally activated generation of carriers across a narrow band gap. The gap collapses at about 20 kbar when SmS becomes a true metal. At this pressure, the material also changes from paramagnetic to a magnetic state.

The semiconductor-metal transition in samarium monochalcogenides requires application of pressure or presence of intrinsic stress, for example in thin films, and the reverse changes occur upon release of this stress. Such release can be triggered by various means, such as heating to about 200 °C or irradiation with a pulsed, high-intensity laser beam.

== Potential applications ==
The change in electrical resistivity in samarium monochalcogenides can be used in a pressure sensor or in a memory device triggered between a low-resistance and high-resistance state by external pressure, and such devices are being developed commercially. Samarium monosulfide also generates electric voltage upon moderate heating to about 150 °C that can be applied in thermoelectric power converters.
