= Cerium nitride =

Names
- Other names cerium mononitride, azanylidynecerium

Identifiers
CAS Number	25764-08-3
3D model (JSmol)	Interactive image
ChemSpider	105113
EC Number	247-243-0
PubChem CID	117625
UNII	5PUM688GQ2
CompTox Dashboard (EPA)	DTXSID5067138
- InChI: InChI=1S/Ce.N Key: BCZWPKDRLPGFFZ-UHFFFAOYSA-N
- SMILES: N#[Ce]

Properties
Chemical formula	CeN
Molar mass	154.123 g·mol^{−1}
Appearance	Brown powder
Melting point	2,557 °C (4,635 °F; 2,830 K)

Hazards
- GHS labelling
Pictograms	(GHS07: Exclamation mark)
Signal word	Warning
Hazard statements	H315, H319, H335
Precautionary statements	P233, P262, P280, P304, P305, P338, P340, P351, P403, P501
- Except where otherwise noted, data are given for materials in their standard state (at 25 °C [77 °F], 100 kPa). Infobox references

Cerium nitride is a binary inorganic compound of cerium and nitrogen with the chemical formula CeN.

== Synthesis ==
CeN can be obtained by direct chemistry of cerium with nitrogen at 850–900 °C.

2Ce + N_{2} → 2CeN

== Physical properties ==
CeN forms a brown powder with a melting point of 2557 °C. The compound is a semi-metallic conductor, stable in dry air.

== Uses ==
CeN can be used to simulate the properties of uranium mononitride (UN).
