= Praseodymium monotelluride =

Names
- Other names Praseodymium telluride

Identifiers
CAS Number	12125-60-9
3D model (JSmol)	Interactive image
- InChI: InChI=1S/Pr.Te
- SMILES: [Pr].[Te]

Properties
Chemical formula	PrTe
Molar mass	268.51 g/mol
Appearance	Violet-blue crystalline solid
Density	7.07 g/cm^{3}

Structure
Crystal structure	Cubic, rock-salt type
Space group	Fm3̅m, No. 225
Lattice constant	a = 0.6317 nm
Formula units (Z)	4
- Except where otherwise noted, data are given for materials in their standard state (at 25 °C [77 °F], 100 kPa). Infobox references

Praseodymium monotelluride, is an inorganic compound of praseodymium and tellurium with the formula PrTe. It is a metallic rare-earth monochalcogenide that crystallizes in the cubic sodium chloride structure. Praseodymium is essentially trivalent in the compound, whose electronic structure therefore cannot be described as a simple Pr^{2+}Te^{2−} ionic salt.

== Preparation ==
Praseodymium monotelluride can be prepared by direct reaction of praseodymium and tellurium at high temperature:

Pr + Te → PrTe

Polycrystalline material has been prepared by pressing mixtures of the elements and annealing them under vacuum or an inert atmosphere at temperatures around 1600–1800 °C. Single crystals have also been grown from stoichiometric praseodymium–tellurium mixtures at high temperature.

== Properties ==
=== Structure ===
PrTe crystallizes in the cubic crystal system with the rock salt structure, space group Fm3̅m (No. 225). Reported lattice parameters are approximately a = 6.31–6.32 Å. A later single-crystal study gave a = 6.3172 Å. The structure contains four PrTe formula units per unit cell. Using the reported lattice constant gives a calculated density of approximately 7.07 g/cm^{3}.

=== Phase stability ===
Praseodymium monotelluride is one of several stable phases in the Pr–Te binary system. Unlike most of the more tellurium-rich praseodymium tellurides, it melts congruently. The Pr–Te system also contains Pr_{3}Te_{4}, Pr_{2}Te_{3}, Pr_{4}Te_{7}, PrTe_{1.9}, Pr_{3}Te_{7}, Pr_{2}Te_{5}, Pr_{4}Te_{11} and PrTe_{3}.

=== Electronic and magnetic properties ===
PrTe is metallic. The localized 4f electrons of Pr^{3+} are split by the cubic crystalline electric field. The ground state is a nonmagnetic singlet, while the first excited magnetic triplet lies approximately 74 K higher in energy. As a consequence, PrTe is a Van Vleck paramagnet rather than a conventional local-moment magnet. Measurements down to about 1.4 K found no magnetic ordering. At 4.2 K its susceptibility is nearly temperature-independent and decreases slightly under hydrostatic pressure. The measured pressure coefficient, expressed as (1/χ)(dχ/dP), is approximately −1 × 10^{−3} kbar^{−1}.

=== Thermal transport ===
The thermal conductivity of PrTe and related praseodymium monochalcogenides has been measured over a wide temperature range. Early measurements described PrTe as a violet-blue, metallic rock-salt-type solid.
