= Neptunium arsenide =

Names
- Other names Neptunium monoarsenide

Identifiers
CAS Number	39350-08-8
3D model (JSmol)	Interactive image
ChemSpider	129549224
- InChI: InChI=1S/As.Np Key: AUGTYUNFKAYNPM-UHFFFAOYSA-N
- SMILES: [Np].[As]

Properties
Chemical formula	NpAs
Molar mass	311.92
Appearance	Crystals

Related compounds
Related compounds	Neptunium diarsenide
- Except where otherwise noted, data are given for materials in their standard state (at 25 °C [77 °F], 100 kPa). Infobox references

Neptunium arsenide is a binary inorganic compound of neptunium and arsenic with the chemical formula NpAs. The compound forms crystals.

== Synthesis ==
Heating stoichiometric amounts of pure substances:

$$\mathsf{ Np + As \ \xrightarrow{T, I_2}\ NpAs }$$

== Physical properties ==
Neptunium arsenide forms crystals of several modifications:

- Cubic system, space group Fm3m, cell parameters a = 0.5835 nm, exists at temperatures below –131 °С.
- Tetragonal system, cell parameters a = 0.58312 nm, c = 0.58281 nm, exists in the temperature range –131 to –98 °С.
- Cubic system, space group Fm3m, cell parameters a = 0.58318 nm, exists at temperatures above –98 °C.

Neptunium arsenide becomes antiferromagnetic at 175 K.
