= Neodymium bismuthide =

Names
- Other names Neodymium(III) bismuthide

Identifiers
CAS Number	12233-02-2
3D model (JSmol)	Interactive image
ChemSpider	65322177
PubChem CID	44153527
CompTox Dashboard (EPA)	DTXSID4065286
- InChI: InChI=1S/Bi.Nd Key: VNARRZRNLSEBPY-UHFFFAOYSA-N
- SMILES: [Nd].[Bi]

Properties
Chemical formula	BiNd
Molar mass	352.22 g/mol
Density	8.8 g/cm^{3}
Melting point	1775°C; 1900°C
Critical point (T, P)	−111 kJ/mol

Structure
Crystal structure	cubic
Space group	Fm3m
Lattice constant	a = 6.4222 Å
Formula units (Z)	4

Related compounds
Other anions	Neodymium(III) nitride Neodymium(III) arsenide Neodymium(III) phosphide Neodymium(III) antimonide Neodymium(III) oxide
Other cations	PrBi
- Except where otherwise noted, data are given for materials in their standard state (at 25 °C [77 °F], 100 kPa). Infobox references

Neodymium bismuthide or Bismuth-Neodymium is a binary inorganic compound of neodymium and bismuth with the formula NdBi. It forms crystals.

== Preparation ==
Neodymium bismuthide can be prepared by reacting a stoichiometric amount of neodymium and bismuth at 1900°C:

Nd + Bi → NdBi

== Physical properties ==
Neodymium bismuthide forms cubic crystals of the space group Fm3m, with cell parameters a = 0.64222 nm, Z = 4 with a structure like sodium chloride. The compound melts at 1900°C. At a temperature of 24 K, an antiferromagnetic transition occurs in the compound.
