= Cerium phosphide =

Identifiers
CAS Number	25275-75-6
3D model (JSmol)	Interactive image
ChemSpider	82506
EC Number	246-783-4
PubChem CID	91372
CompTox Dashboard (EPA)	DTXSID201314541
- InChI: InChI=1S/Ce.P Key: SMKQIOCKGHFKQZ-UHFFFAOYSA-N
- SMILES: [Ce+3].[P-3]

Properties
Chemical formula	CeP
Molar mass	171.090 g·mol^{−1}
Appearance	grey crystals
- Except where otherwise noted, data are given for materials in their standard state (at 25 °C [77 °F], 100 kPa). Infobox references

Cerium phosphide is an inorganic compound with the chemical formula CeP. It is one of the phosphides of cerium. It can be obtained by reacting cerium dioxide and phosphine at 1300 °C in the presence of hydrogen, or by reacting sodium phosphide and cerium chloride at 700~800 °C. It will be oxidized to monoclinic CePO_{4} in air above 900 °C. It reacts with iodine in a quartz ampoule to obtain CeSiP_{3}.

== External reading ==
- Pavel S. Chizhov, Nellie R. Khasanova, Michael Baitinger, Walter Schnelle, Yuri Prots, Ulrich Burkhardt, Evgeny V. Antipov, Yuri Grin (2006-09-01). "Ce 4 (P 1- x Si x ) 3- z : A First Example for the Stabilization of the Anti-Th 3 P 4 Type Structure by Substitution in the Non-Metal Substructure". Inorganic Chemistry. 45 (18): 7210–7216. doi:10.1021/ic060726h. ISSN 0020-1669. PMID 16933921.
