= II-VI semiconductor compound =

II-VI semiconductor compounds are compounds composed of a metal from either group 2 or 12 of the periodic table (the alkaline earth metals and group 12 elements, formerly called groups IIA and IIB) and a nonmetal from group 16 (the chalcogens, formerly called group VI). These semiconductors crystallize either in the zincblende lattice structure or the wurtzite crystal structure. They generally exhibit large band gaps, making them popular for short wavelength applications in optoelectronics.

== Fabrication ==
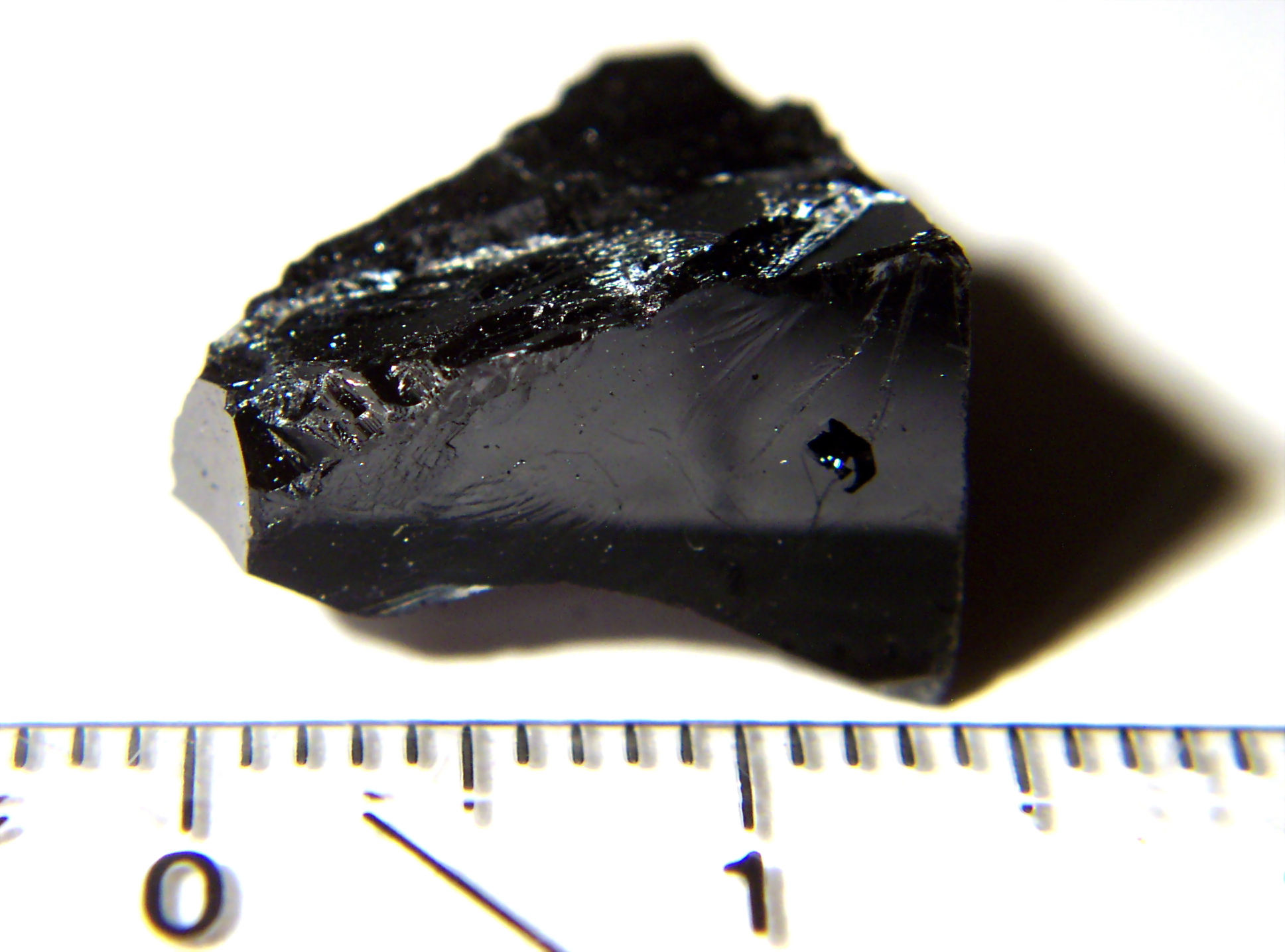
Very pure cadmium telluride crystal for semiconductor applications

II-VI semiconductor compounds are produced with epitaxy methods, like most semiconductor compounds. The substrate plays an important role for all fabrication methods. Best growth results are obtained by substrates made from the same compound (homoepitaxy), but substrates of other semiconductors are often used to reduce the fabrication cost (a method called heteroepitaxy). In particular, III-V semiconductor compounds like gallium arsenide are frequently used as cheap substrates, resulting in stronger tensions between substrate and growth layer and (generally) lower optoelectronic properties.

== Properties ==
Especially wide bandgap II-VI semiconductor compounds are expected to be very good candidates for high performance applications, such as light emitting diodes and laser diodes for blue and ultraviolet applications. Due to problems with conductivity, the application of these materials is still questionable. The best example is zinc oxide, which shows excellent optical characteristics, though it remains problematic to create sufficient charge carrier densities via doping in zinc oxide.

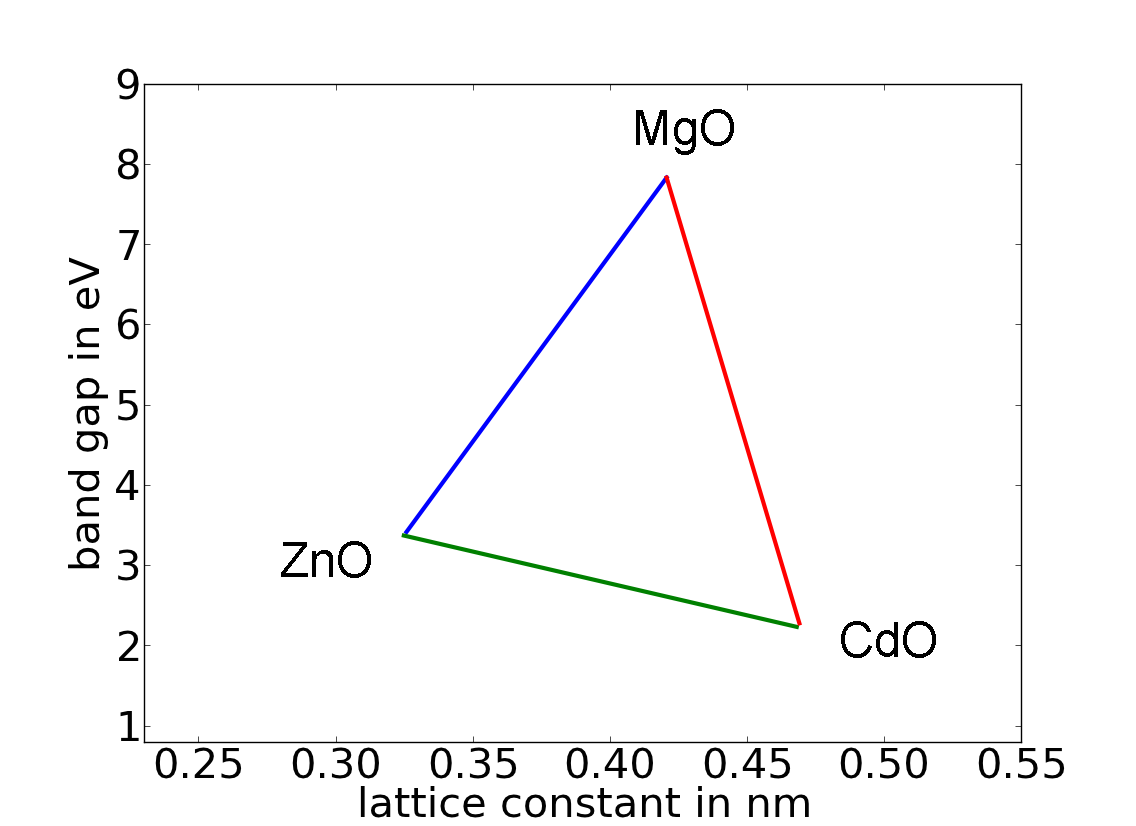
Diagram of the band gap plotted versus the lattice parameter a of the ternary alloy combinations of ZnO, CdO and MgO

Ternary compounds are one option to vary the band gap of semiconductors almost continuously over a wide energy range. This method is highly dependent on the materials as well as the growth techniques. In particular, materials with very different lattice constants or different crystal phases (wurtzite or zincblende in this case) are difficult to combine. Tensions and impurities due to low crystal quality result in low optoelectronic properties. One example of the basic possibilities achievable with three different compounds is shown in the diagram with zinc oxide (ZnO), cadmium oxide (CdO) and magnesium oxide (MgO). Basically it is possible to gain any band gap between those of the three materials. Consequently, it is possible to choose very specifically the wavelength of photons emitted by laser diodes or light emitting diodes.

== See also ==
- Wide-bandgap semiconductor
- List of semiconductor materials
