= Ytterbium(II) sulfide =

Names
- Other names Ytterbium monosulfide, ytterbium(II) sulfide

Identifiers
CAS Number	23344-43-6
3D model (JSmol)	Interactive image
ChemSpider	103867627
- InChI: InChI=1S/S.Yb Key: QHGZBASAVJOMNS-UHFFFAOYSA-N
- SMILES: [Yb+2].[S-2]

Properties
Chemical formula	SYb
Molar mass	205.11 g·mol^{−1}
Appearance	black crystals
Density	6.68 g/cm^{3}
Melting point	2,038 °C (3,700 °F; 2,311 K)

Structure
Crystal structure	cubic
- Except where otherwise noted, data are given for materials in their standard state (at 25 °C [77 °F], 100 kPa). Infobox references

Ytterbium(II) sulfide is a binary inorganic compound of ytterbium and sulfur with the chemical formula YbS.

== Synthesis ==
Synthesis of ytterbium(II) sulfide can be via a reaction of pure substances in an inert atmosphere:

Yb + S → YbS

An alternative synthesis is by comproportionation of ytterbium(III) sulfide and ytterbium metal in vacuum at 1000–1100 °C:

Yb_{2}S_{3} + Yb → 3YbS

== Physical properties ==
Ytterbium(II) sulfide forms black crystals of cubic symmetry, space group Fm3m, cell parameter a = 0.5658 nm, Z = 4.

Ytterbium(II) sulfide demonstrates semiconductor behavior.
