= Samarium(III) nitride =

Names
- Other names samarium mononitride, azanylidynesamarium

Identifiers
CAS Number	25764-14-1
3D model (JSmol)	Interactive image
ChemSpider	105119
ECHA InfoCard	100.042.940
EC Number	247-249-3
PubChem CID	117631
UNII	VF9ZWX9YO6
CompTox Dashboard (EPA)	DTXSID401314878
- InChI: InChI=1S/N.Sm Key: SZZXSKFKZJTWOY-UHFFFAOYSA-N
- SMILES: N#[Sm]

Properties
Chemical formula	NSm
Molar mass	164.37 g·mol^{−1}
Density	8.4 g/cm^{3}
- Except where otherwise noted, data are given for materials in their standard state (at 25 °C [77 °F], 100 kPa). Infobox references

Samarium(III) nitride is a binary inorganic compound of samarium and nitrogen with the chemical formula SmN.

== Preparation ==
Samarium(III) nitrate can be prepared by directly reacting samarium and nitrogen at 800 °C:

2 Sm + N_{2} → 2 SmN

== Properties ==
Samarium(III) nitride forms cubic crystals, space group Fm3̅m, unit cell parameters a = 0.50481 nm, Z = 4, and a structure like sodium chloride.
