= Strontium selenide =

Identifiers
CAS Number	1315-07-7
3D model (JSmol)	Interactive image
ChemSpider	66606
ECHA InfoCard	100.013.872
EC Number	215-258-1
PubChem CID	73978
CompTox Dashboard (EPA)	DTXSID801014323
- InChI: InChI=1S/Se.Sr/q-2;+2 Key: BCTHFFLRHBNYHU-UHFFFAOYSA-N
- SMILES: [Se-2].[Sr+2]

Properties
Chemical formula	SrSe
Molar mass	166.58
Appearance	White powder, turns reddish brown when exposed to air
Density	4.5

Hazards
- GHS labelling
Pictograms	(GHS06: Toxic) (GHS08: Health hazard) (GHS09: Environmental hazard)
Signal word	Danger
Hazard statements	H301, H331, H373, H410
Precautionary statements	P260, P264, P270, P271, P273, P301+P316, P304+P340, P316, P319, P321, P330, P391, P403+P233, P405, P501
- Except where otherwise noted, data are given for materials in their standard state (at 25 °C [77 °F], 100 kPa). Infobox references

Strontium selenide is an inorganic compound with the chemical formula SrSe.

== Preparation ==
Strontium selenide can be prepared by reducing strontium selenate with hydrogen at 600 °C. It can also be produced by reacting strontium and hydrogen selenide in liquid ammonia.

== Properties ==
Strontium selenide crystallizes in the orthorhombic crystal system with space group Fm3̅m. It has a NaCl structure. It transforms into a CsCl structure with a space group Pm3m under high pressure (14 GPa).

It reacts with mercury selenide and germanium diselenide at high temperature to obtain the SrHgGeSe_{4} crystal. It reacts with thorium and selenium at high temperature in the presence of tin to obtain SrTh_{2}Se_{5}.
