= Uranium diselenide =

Identifiers
CAS Number	12138-21-5
3D model (JSmol)	Interactive image
ChemSpider	74838
ECHA InfoCard	100.032.029
EC Number	235-245-4
PubChem CID	82939
CompTox Dashboard (EPA)	DTXSID7065257
- InChI: InChI=1S/2Se.U Key: WIQPIQPRLFROPS-UHFFFAOYSA-N
- SMILES: [Se-2].[Se-2].[U+4]

Properties
Chemical formula	USe_{2}
Molar mass	395.948 g/mol
Appearance	black crystalline solid
- Except where otherwise noted, data are given for materials in their standard state (at 25 °C [77 °F], 100 kPa). Infobox references

Uranium diselenide is a compound of uranium and selenium. It has a β form that has orthorhombic crystal system. The family of crystals it matches is PbCl_{2}. The dimensions of the unit cell are a: 7.455 Å, b: 4.2320 Å, c= 8.964 Å. The compound has the unusual property of ferromagnetism, but only if the temperature is below 14 K.

Tellurium can be substituted for selenium in varying quantities, expanding the lattice and increasing the ferromagnetic Curie temperature.
