= Cerium monosulfide =

Names
- Other names Cerium sulfide (CeS)

Identifiers
CAS Number	12014-82-3
3D model (JSmol)	Interactive image
ChemSpider	76827115
CompTox Dashboard (EPA)	DTXSID7065170
- InChI: InChI=1S/Ce.S Key: INJMJSIZAXAEMH-UHFFFAOYSA-N
- SMILES: S=[Ce]

Properties
Chemical formula	CeS
Molar mass	172.18 g·mol^{−1}
Appearance	Yellow crystalline solid
Density	5.9 g/cm^{3}
Melting point	2,445 °C (4,433 °F; 2,718 K)
Solubility in water	insoluble

Structure
Crystal structure	cubic

Related compounds
Other anions	Cerium monoselenide Cerium monotelluride
- Except where otherwise noted, data are given for materials in their standard state (at 25 °C [77 °F], 100 kPa). Infobox references

Cerium monosulfide is a binary inorganic compound of cerium and sulfur with the chemical formula CeS. This is the simplest of cerium sulfides.

== Synthesis ==
- Reduction reaction of dicerium trisulfide and cerium hydride:

Ce_{2}S_{3} + CeH_{2} → 3CeS + H_{2}

- Reacting cerium metal and sulfur in a planetary ball mill:

Ce + S → CeS

== Physical properties ==
Cerium sulfide forms golden cubic crystals, with space group Fm3̅m and lattice parameter a = 5.763 Å. It has a NaCl-type structure.

The compound melts congruently at a temperature of 2450 °C, the highest out of any known sulfide.

== Chemical properties ==
Cerium monosulfide has a wetting effect on metals, and it is relatively stable to metals other than platinum. It can react violently with platinum to form an intermetallic compound, platinum cerium.
