= Europium(III) nitride =

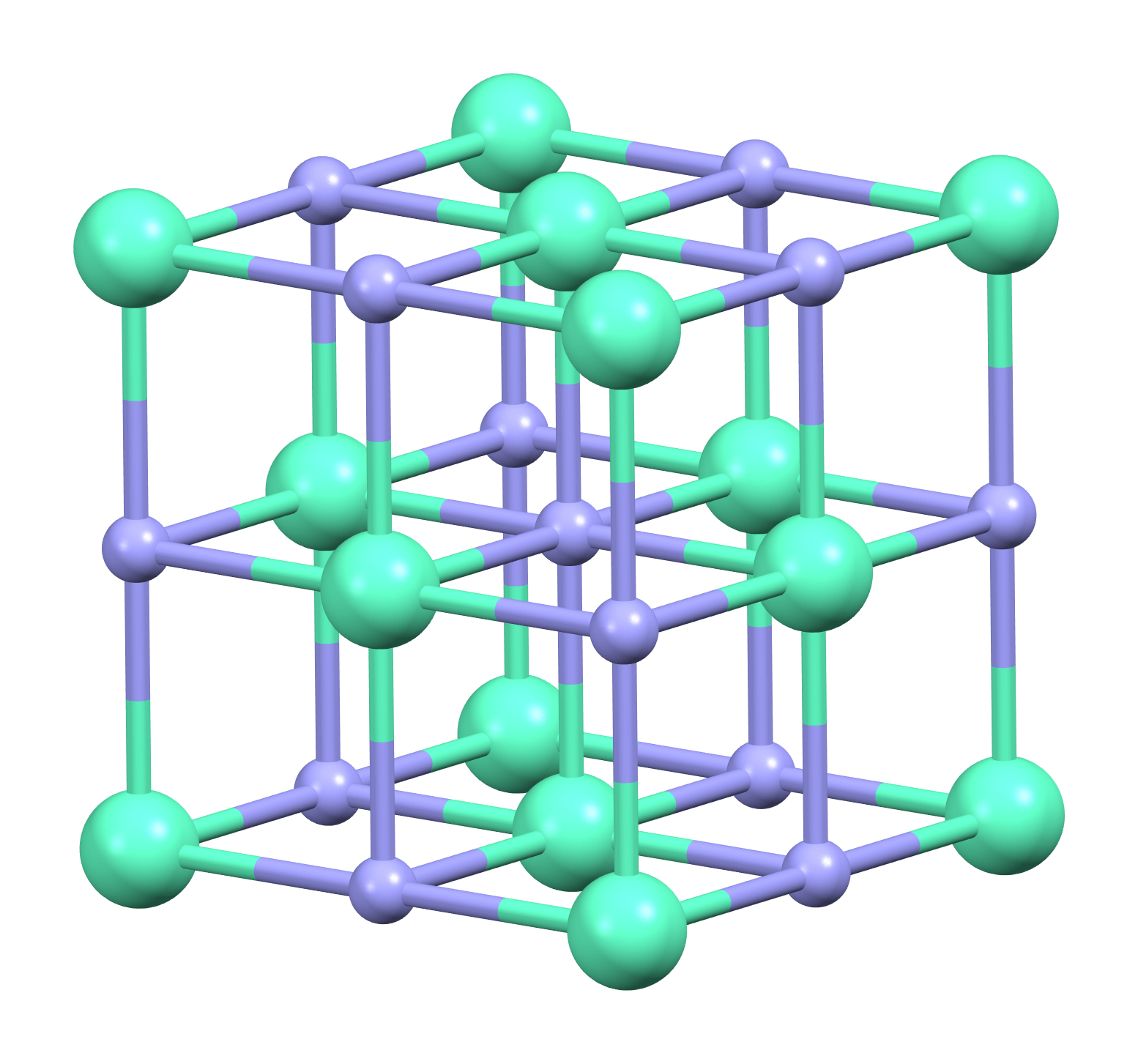
- Unit cell of europium(III) nitride determined by X-ray powder diffraction

Names
- Other names Europium mononitride, azanylidyneuropium, nitridoeuropium

Identifiers
CAS Number	12020-58-5
3D model (JSmol)	Interactive image
ChemSpider	74726
ECHA InfoCard	100.031.496
EC Number	234-659-2
PubChem CID	82808
CompTox Dashboard (EPA)	DTXSID701014194
- InChI: InChI=1S/Eu.N Key: PSBUJOCDKOWAGJ-UHFFFAOYSA-N
- SMILES: N#[Eu]

Properties
Chemical formula	EuN
Molar mass	165.971 g·mol^{−1}
Appearance	black crystals
Density	6.57 g/cm^{3}
Solubility in water	reacts with water
- Except where otherwise noted, data are given for materials in their standard state (at 25 °C [77 °F], 100 kPa). Infobox references

Europium(III) nitride is a binary inorganic compound of europium and nitrogen with the chemical formula EuN.

== Synthesis ==
Europium(III) nitride can be produced via the reaction of elemental europium in an ammonia stream in corundum boats in silica glass tubes. The reaction takes place at 700 °C.

2Eu + 2NH_{3} → 2EuN + 3H_{2}

In this reaction, europium is oxidized and the hydrogen in ammonia is reduced.

== Physical properties ==
Europium(III) nitride shows Van Vleck paramagnetism and crystallizes in the rock salt structure with a = 501.779(6) pm. Thin films of rare earth nitrides, including europium(III) nitride, tend to form oxides in the presence of oxygen. The enthalpy of formation of EuN is: ΔH_{0} = 217.6±25.1 kJ/mol. The band gap for europium(III) nitride was calculated to be 2.08 eV.

Europium(III) nitride forms black crystals and reacts with water.

== Uses ==
EuN is a semiconductor.
