= Ytterbium(III) nitride =

Names
- Other names Ytterbium mononitride, azanylidynytterbium, nitridoytterbium

Identifiers
CAS Number	24600-77-9
3D model (JSmol)	Interactive image
ChemSpider	81760
ECHA InfoCard	100.042.117
EC Number	246-345-2
PubChem CID	90553
CompTox Dashboard (EPA)	DTXSID501313778
- InChI: InChI=1S/N.Yb Key: XLWMYKCPNRBIDK-UHFFFAOYSA-N
- SMILES: N#[Yb]

Properties
Chemical formula	NYb
Molar mass	187.052 g·mol^{−1}
Appearance	black powder
Density	6.57 g/cm^{3}
- Except where otherwise noted, data are given for materials in their standard state (at 25 °C [77 °F], 100 kPa). Infobox references

Ytterbium(III) nitride is a binary inorganic compound of ytterbium and nitrogen with the chemical formula YbN.

== Synthesis ==
Ytterbium(III) nitride can be prepared from the reaction of ytterbium hydride and ammonia at 800°C:

2YbH_{2} + 2NH_{3} → 2YbN + 5H_{2}

It can also be prepared from the reaction of ytterbium and nitrogen with an admixture of hydrogen under pressure at 500–600°C::

2Yb + N_{2} → 2YbN

== Physical properties ==
Ytterbium(III) nitride forms a black powder. The compound is notable for its high melting point.

== Uses ==
Ytterbium(III) nitride holds potential applications in the fields of electronics and optics. It is also used as an additive for special alloys, ceramic materials, semiconductors.
