= Samarium monosulfide =

Identifiers
| 3D model (JSmol) | Interactive image |
- InChI: InChI=1S/S.Sm/q-2;+2 Key: KASDAGLLEDDKAA-UHFFFAOYSA-N
- SMILES: [S-2].[Sm+2]

Properties
| Chemical formula | SSm |
| Molar mass | 182.42 g·mol^{−1} |
| Appearance | dark brown crystals |
| Melting point | 1,940 °C (3,520 °F; 2,210 K) |

Structure
| Crystal structure | cubic |

Related compounds
| Other cations | Neodymium sulfide |
- Except where otherwise noted, data are given for materials in their standard state (at 25 °C [77 °F], 100 kPa). Infobox references

Samarium monosulfide is a binary inorganic chemical compound of samarium metal and sulfur with the chemical formula SmS.

== Synthesis ==
Fusion of stoichiometric amounts of pure substances:

Sm + S → SmS

== Physical properties ==
Samarium monosulfide forms crystals of cubic system, spatial group Fm3m, cell parameters a = 0.5970–0.5863 nm, Z = 4, structurally isomorphic with NaCl.

The compound melts congruently at a temperature of 1500 °C, 1940 °C, or 2080 °C.

SmS is a chalcogenide material that exists in two possible states: as a metal (also called "golden") and as a semiconductor ("blue" or "black"). As a result, SmS has gained considerable interest as a switchable material.

== Uses ==
Samarium monosulfide has a high sensitivity to deformation. Therefore, SmS is a promising material for creating pressure sensors of force, torque, accelerations, etc.
