= VDIworks =

Software company

VDIworks, Inc.
- Type: Private
- Industry: Computer software
- Founded: 2008
- Headquarters: Austin, Texas, United States
- Area served: Global
- Key people: Saad Hassan (CEO); John Teller
- Products: Application delivery industry, virtualization software (DaaS), SaaS, cloud, and networking
- Website: www.vdiworks.com

VDIworks is an American software company founded in 2008 that provides services like desktop virtualization, desktop as a service (DaaS), networking, PCoIP and cloud computing.

VDIworks built the very first PCoIP broker connection which is the industry’s only PCoIP broker with quad broking support. VDIworks VDI Technology service comes with full physical management. VDIworks helps virtual desktops with a high-speed connection protocol.

== History ==
VDIworks, Inc. started its services in 2008 like virtual desktop enablement and management software. It offers fast remote desktop to bring the power of Windows to iPad to run Microsoft Office, as well as access spreadsheets, PowerPoint presentations, and other PC documents while travelling; and VideoOverIP, a remoting protocol for virtual desktops that delivers multimedia performance and multi-monitor capabilities by capitalizing on the management improvements, security enhancements, and lowered TCO that result from virtualization.

== Expansion ==
The company provides Virtual Desktop Platform (VDP), a virtual desktop infrastructure management system, which combines connection brokering, VM management, health, alerting, inventory, physical management, and support for various remoting protocols; and VDIvision for System Center Operations Manager 2007 to combine the power of the VDIworks Virtual Desktop Platform with the ubiquity and datacenter management capabilities of System Center.

In addition, VDIworks, Inc. introduced VDIworks2Go, an extension to the VDIworks VDP Console that allows mobile users to check out a virtual machine and compute on the go even when they are not connected to a network; and Protocol Inspector to discover and report on remoting capabilities of VMs and hosts on a network.

Further, the company provides cloud computing, desktop virtualization, remote access, and systems management technologies. VDIworks, Inc. offers its software for education, healthcare, financial services, small- to medium-sized businesses, and enterprise markets. VDIworks, Inc. is a prior subsidiary of ClearCube Technology, Inc.

== Products ==
Virtual Desktops Platform 3.2

VDIworks Virtual Desktop Platform is a VDI management suite for connection brokering, remoting protocol, centralized management and desktop security.

Virtual Desktops for Healthcare

Virtual Desktop for Healthcare aggregates user environment on a few servers, and replacing PCs, hardy and completely secure thin clients, and virtual desktops represent the next evolution of the healthcare PC.

Virtual Desktops for Education

VDIworks have made remote access possible to educational institutions through the power of virtualization. This has removed the limitations of location and single desktop dependency; users can access information whether in the classroom, restaurant at home or travelling.

== Recognition ==
VDIworks received the best emerging virtualization company award multiple times from CRN for its contribution and commitment towards virtualization innovation and awareness.
