= Sun Ray =

Series of thin client computer

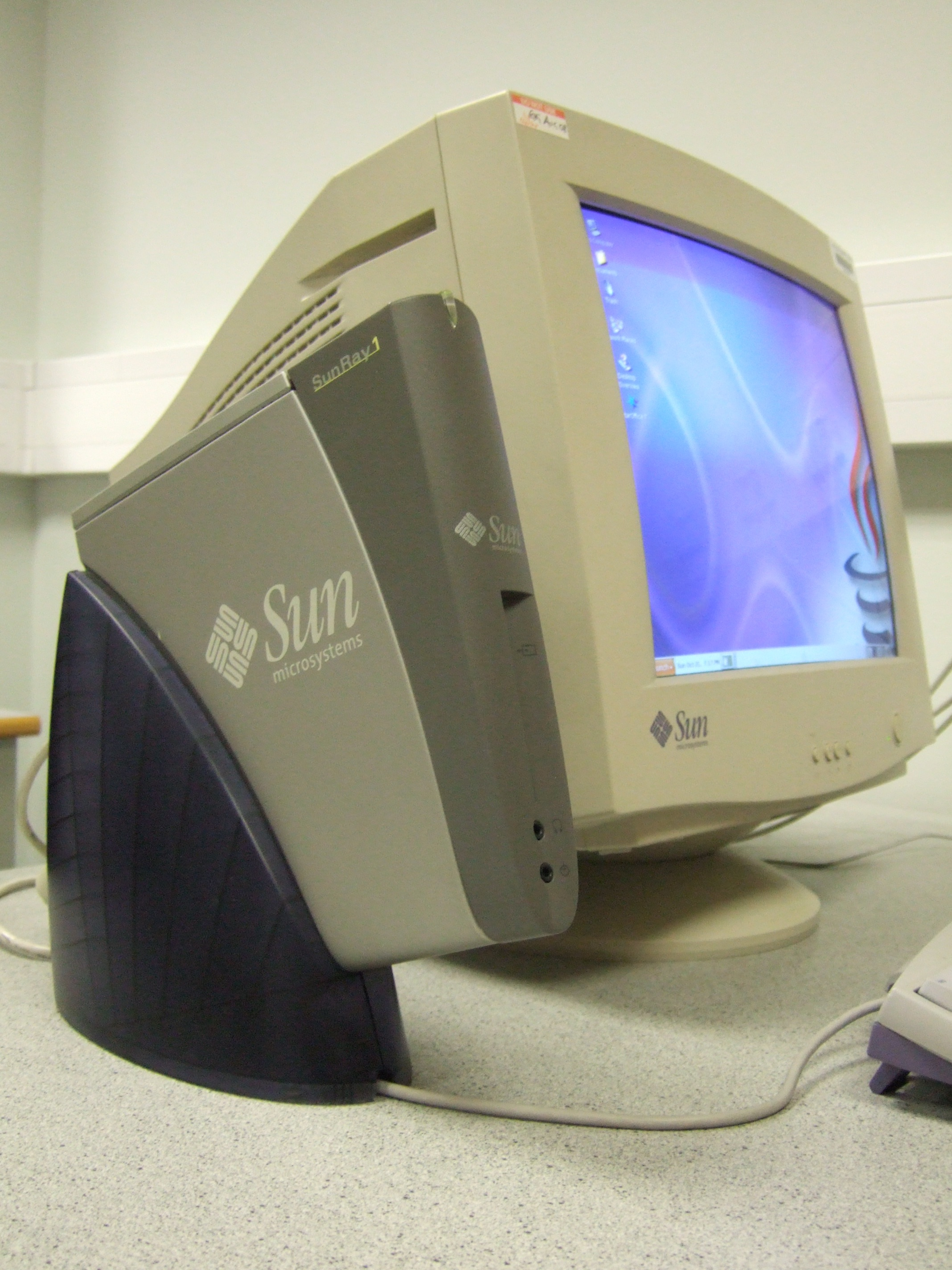
- Sun Ray 1G thin client
- Manufacturer: Oracle Corporation
- Type: Thin-client
- Released: September 1999
- Lifespan: 1999–2014
- Units sold: 500,000+
- Media: Smartcard
- CPU: MicroSPARC IIep
- Memory: 8 MiB EDO DRAM
- Input: USB
- Connectivity: Ethernet
- Power: 110 V – 240 V 50/60 Hz
- Predecessor: NeWT
- Related: Appliance Link Protocol

The Sun Ray is a stateless thin client computer (and associated software) aimed at corporate environments, that was originally introduced by Sun Microsystems in September 1999 and discontinued by Oracle Corporation in 2014. It features a smart card reader and several models featuring an integrated flat panel display.

The idea of a stateless desktop was a significant shift from, and the eventual successor to, Sun's earlier line of diskless Java-only desktops, the JavaStation.

== Predecessor ==
The concept began in Sun Microsystems Laboratories in 1997 as a project codenamed NetWorkTerminal (NeWT). The client was designed to be small, low cost, low power, and silent. It was based on the Sun Microelectronics MicroSPARC IIep. Other processors initially considered for it included Intel's StrongARM, Philips Semiconductors' TriMedia, and National Semiconductor's Geode. The MicroSPARC IIep was selected because of its high level of integration, good performance, low cost, and availability.

NeWT included 8 MiB of EDO DRAM and 4 MiB of NOR flash. The graphics controller used was the ATI Rage 128 because of its low power, 2D rendering performance, and low cost. It also included an ATI video encoder for TV-out (removed in the Sun Ray 1), a Philips Semiconductor SAA7114 video decoder/scaler, Crystal Semiconductor audio CODEC, Sun Microelectronics Ethernet controller, PCI USB host interface with 4 port hub, and I²C smart card interface. The motherboard and daughtercard were housed in an off-the-shelf commercial small form-factor PC case with internal +12/+5VDC auto ranging power supply.

NeWT was designed to have feature parity with a modern business PC in every way possible. Instead of a commercial operating system. the client ran a real-time operating system called "exec", which was originally developed in Sun Labs as part of an Ethernet-based security camera project codenamed NetCam. Less than 60 NeWTs were ever built and very few survived; one is in the collection of the Computer History Museum in Mountain View, California.

In July 2013, reports circulated that Oracle was ending the development of the Sun Ray and related products. Scott McNealy (long-time CEO of Sun) posted about this on Twitter. An official announcement was made on August 1, 2013, with the last order in February 2014. Support and hardware maintenance were available until 2017.

== Design ==
In contrast to a thick client, the Sun Ray is only a networked display device, with applications running on a server elsewhere, and the state of the user's session being independent of the display. This enables another feature of the Sun Ray; portable sessions where a user can go from one Sun Ray to another and continue their work without closing any programs. With a smart card, all the user had to do was insert the card and they would be presented with their session. Reauthentication requirements depend on the mode of operation. For example, without the smart card the procedure was almost identical, except the user must specify their username as well as password. In either case, if a session did not yet exist, a new one would be created the first time the user connects.

Sun Ray clients are connected via an Ethernet network to a Sun Ray Server. Sun Ray Server Software (SRSS) is available for the Solaris and Linux operating systems. Sun developed a separate network display protocol, Appliance Link Protocol (ALP), for the Sun Ray system.

VMware announced support for the protocol by VMware View in 2008.

The Sun Ray Software has two basic modes of operation: generic session or kiosk mode. In a generic session, the user will see the Solaris or Linux login screen of the operating system that is running SRSS. In kiosk mode, the login screen varies depending on the session type in use. Kiosk mode can be used for a number of different desktop or applications. Oracle has integrated a RDP client, VMware View client into the Sun Ray software that can be used in Kiosk mode to start a full-screen Windows session. In this mode, no window manager or Unix desktop is started. The Windows environment can be any OS that supports RDP.

In 2007, Sun and UK company Thruput integrated the Sun Ray 2FS with 28" (2048 × 2048), 30" (2560 × 1600) and 56" (3840 × 2160) displays; in 2008, they trialed an external graphics accelerator that enables the Sun Ray to be used with any high-resolution display.

== Models ==
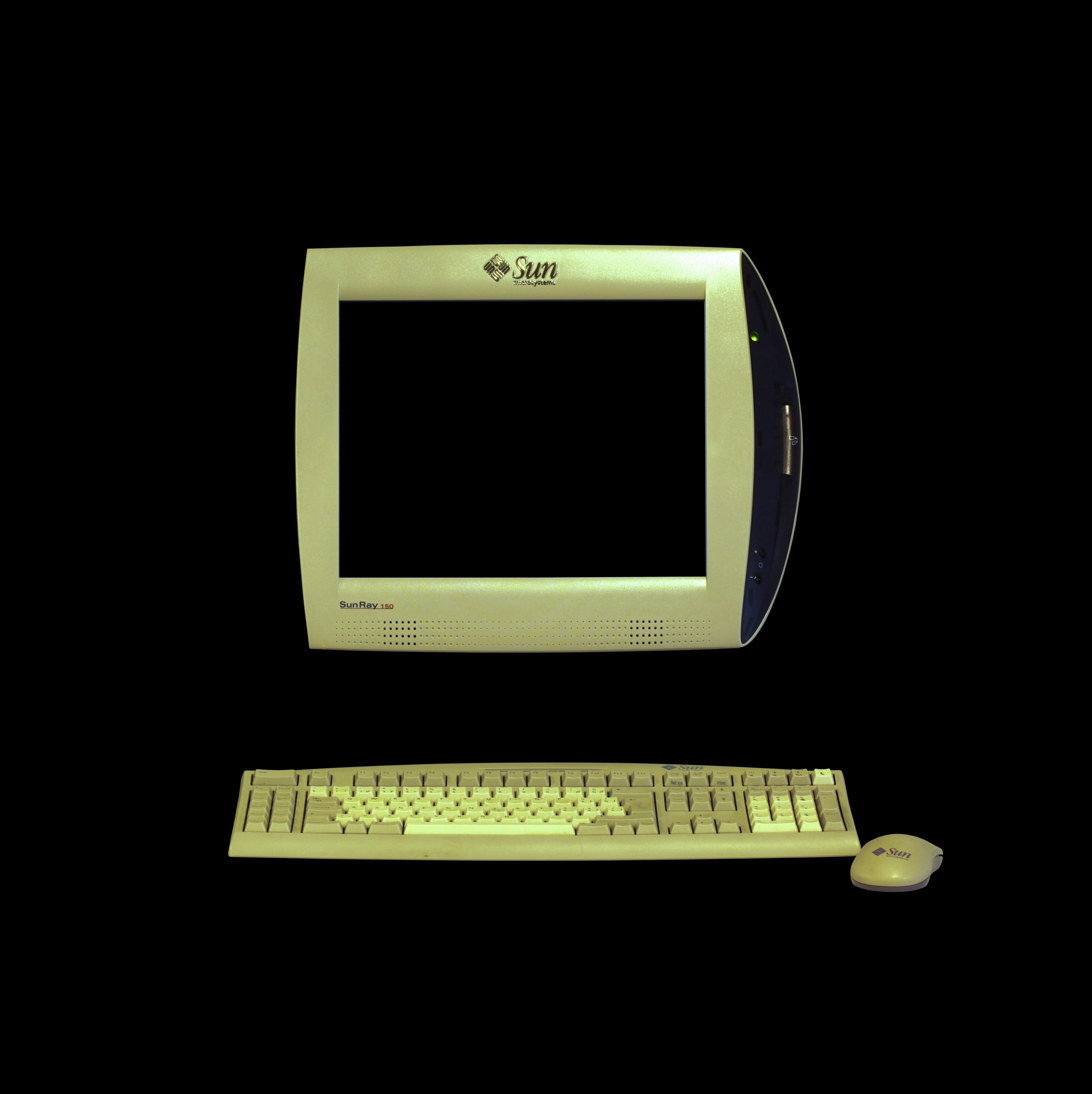
The Sun Ray 150

- NetWork Terminal (NeWT) – Original Sun Labs prototype, no display
- Sun Ray 1 – supports displays up to 1280×1024 at 85 Hz
- Sun Ray 1G – supports displays up to 1920×1200 at 75 Hz
- Sun Ray 100 – integrated into a 17" CRT monitor
- Sun Ray 150 – integrated into a 15" LCD monitor
- Sun Ray 170 – integrated into a 17" LCD monitor
- Sun Ray 2 – small footprint, low power (4 watts). Two versions exist, the original based on DDR memory, the newer one based on DDR2. Firmware is not compatible between the DDR and the DDR2 models and SRSS needs patches to work correctly with the newer variant.
- Sun Ray 2FS – support for dual heads, 100BASE-FX
- Sun Ray 270 – integrated into a 17" LCD, mountable
- Sun Ray 3 – Supports graphics resolutions of up to 1920 × 1200, five Universal Serial Bus (USB) 2.0 ports, one serial port (DB9), One single-DVI-I video connector, 10/100/1000 Mbit/s (RJ45) Ethernet
- Sun Ray 3i – Full HD 1920 × 1080 maximum resolution 16:9 widescreen 21.5" LCD, five USB 2.0 ports, built-in smart card reader, VESA 100 × 100 mm mount and removable stand.
- Sun Ray 3 plus – support for dual head Dual-Link DVI maximum resolution up to 2560 x 1600 30" LCD, four Universal Serial Bus (USB) 2.0 ports, built-in smart card reader, one serial port (DB9), Gigabit Ethernet (RJ-45 and SFP), Energy Star 5.0 qualified (14.15 W in use), headphone and mic jacks.

The Sun Ray 3 models were the last in production; last order date February 28, 2014; last ship date August 31, 2014.

Sun's OEM partners produced Wi-Fi notebook versions of Sun Ray:

- Comet 12 – Sun Ray 12" notebook produced by General Dynamics
- Comet 15 – Sun Ray 15" notebook produced by General Dynamics
- Jasper 320 – Sun Ray 2 notebook produced by Naturetech
- Amber 808 – Sun Ray 2 tablet produced by Naturetech
- Opal 608 – Sun Ray 2 tablet produced by Naturetech
- Gobi 7 – Sun Ray 2 notebook produced by Aimtec
- Gobi 8 – Sun Ray 2 notebook with 3G support produced by Aimtec
- Ultra ThinPad – Sun Ray 2 notebook produced by Arima
- Ultra ThinTouch – Sun Ray 2 tablet produced by Arima
- UltraSlim – Sun Ray 2 variant produced by Arima
- Tadpole M1400 – Sun Ray 2 notebook with 3G support produced by Tadpole

== Hardware ==
The Sun Ray 1 clients initially used a 100 MHz MicroSPARC IIep processor, followed by a custom SoC version codenamed Copernicus (US 6,993,617 B2), which was based on the MicroSPARC IIep core, but added 4 MiB of on-chip DRAM, USB, and a smart card interface in addition to the memory controller and PCI interface already on the MicroSPARC IIep.

The Sun Ray 2 and 3 clients use the MIPS architecture-based RMI Alchemy Au1550 processor.

== Software-only client ==
A pure software implementation, Sun Desktop Access Client, was introduced as part of Sun Ray Software 5 (SRS5). This was later rebranded by Oracle as Oracle Virtual Desktop Client; it was discontinued along with the Sun Ray product line in 2014.

== Microsoft Windows access ==
In commercial environments, Sun Rays were most commonly deployed as a thin client to access a Microsoft Windows desktop using the SRSS built-in RDP client uttsc. The desktop can be a Terminal Server session or a Virtual Machine (VDI). This setup is flexible and works well in many environments because the intermediate Sun Ray Server layer is transparent to the Windows desktop. At the same time however, this transparency can also become an issue for software that is location dependent. If location dependent information needs to be added it is possible to extend the functionality of the Sun Ray software with additional custom scripts. The Sun Ray Wiki offers a "Follow Me Printing" setup as an example, e.g. a user always gets the nearest printer as default printer when going from room-to-room or location-to-location, also inside their Windows session. It is relatively easy for an administrator to extend and add to this functionality as required.

== See also ==
- Dell FX100
- Sun VDI
- JavaStation
