= Iland =

US American cloud service company

iland
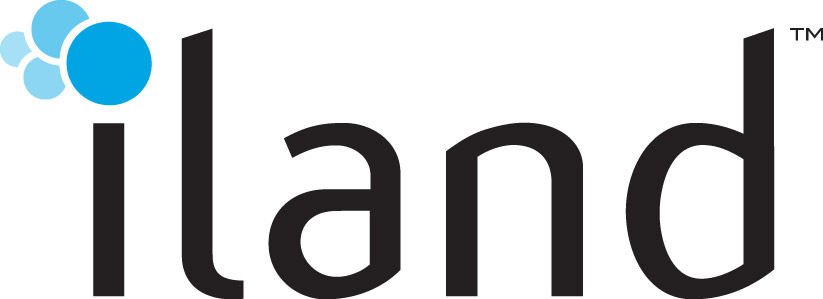
- Type: Privately held
- Industry: Cloud computing, cloud infrastructure, VMware hosting, colocation, disaster recovery, PCoIP, desktop virtualization, SaaS hosting
- Founded: 1995
- Headquarters: Houston, Texas
- Website: www.iland.com

iland Internet Solutions was a provider of hosted cloud infrastructure as a service for production business applications, disaster recovery and business continuity, testing and development, and software as a service enablement for independent software vendors. 11:11 Systems agreed to buy iland in December 2021. When the merger completed in January 2022, all of iland's services and assets were transferred to 11:11.

At the time, iland was a Premier-level partner in the VMware Service Provider Program (VSPP). Founded in 1995, iland offered its services from high availability hubs specifically designed for cloud infrastructure in Boston, Washington D.C., Houston, Los Angeles, Dallas, Manchester, London, Amsterdam, Singapore, Melbourne, and Sydney. iland is a Premier-level partner in the VMware Service Provider Program (VSPP).

iland also provided traditional colocation and global hybrid cloud services, hosting infrastructure (IaaS), disaster recovery (DRaaS), and backup as a service (BaaS). Headquartered in Houston, Texas and London, UK, iland delivers cloud services from its data centers throughout the Americas, Europe, Asia and Australia.

== iland services ==
iland provided cloud-based disaster recovery and business continuity services. Other services included desktop virtualization integrated with a company's overall business continuity and disaster recovery plan, a cloud environment specifically for software as a service (SaaS) providers and merged virtual cloud and physical colocation center servers for custom enterprise configurations. It provides a data replication service for Dell EqualLogic customers.
