= ClearCube =

Computer systems manufacturer in Austin, Texas, USA

ClearCube Technology
- Industry: Information Technology
- Founded: 1997
- Founder: Andrew Heller and Barry Thornton
- Headquarters: Cedar Park, Texas, USA
- Products: Computer hardware, software and services
- Parent: ClearCube Holdings
- Website: ClearCube.com

ClearCube is a computer systems manufacturer based in Austin, Texas, owned by parent company ClearCube Holdings. The company became known for its blade PC products; it has since expanded its offerings to include desktop virtualization and VDI. It was founded in 1997 by Andrew Heller (former IBM Fellow) and Barry Thornton as Vicinity Systems.

In 2005, ClearCube derived about a third of its revenue from virtual infrastructure products sold into the financial services sector, with the majority of their remaining revenue coming from customers in the healthcare and government sectors. ClearCube has continued to focus on virtualization-capable hardware and management software, which has led to strong revenue growth. In 2011, the company announced 50% year-over-year revenue growth due to the strong performance of its virtual desktop products.

In 2011, ClearCube acquired Dallas-based Network Elites. The acquisition brought roughly 25 additional employees to the company and expanded ClearCube's Cloud services capabilities.

== Partnerships ==
Until 2005, IBM was a reseller of the entire product line of ClearCube. After 2005, IBM bundled some of its own hardware with ClearCube's software and diversified its software offering to include Citrix and VMware products. When IBM sold its PC division to Lenovo, the latter also began reselling ClearCube blades. Other major PC manufactures, like HP, also began to compete in the blade PC niche around this time. Other resellers of ClearCube products included Hitachi and SAIC.

In 2008, ClearCube spun off its software division as VDIworks, and while VDIworks has developed additional OEM relationships, the two companies remain closely associated in OEM partnership, and share the same investors and owners. In January 2008, ClearCube also introduced products implementing Teradici's PC-over-IP protocol, including two dual DVI thin clients, the I9420 I/Port and C7420 C/Port, which connect to the blades using copper-based and fiber-optic Ethernet, respectively.
