= JavaStation =

Network Computer for Java applications

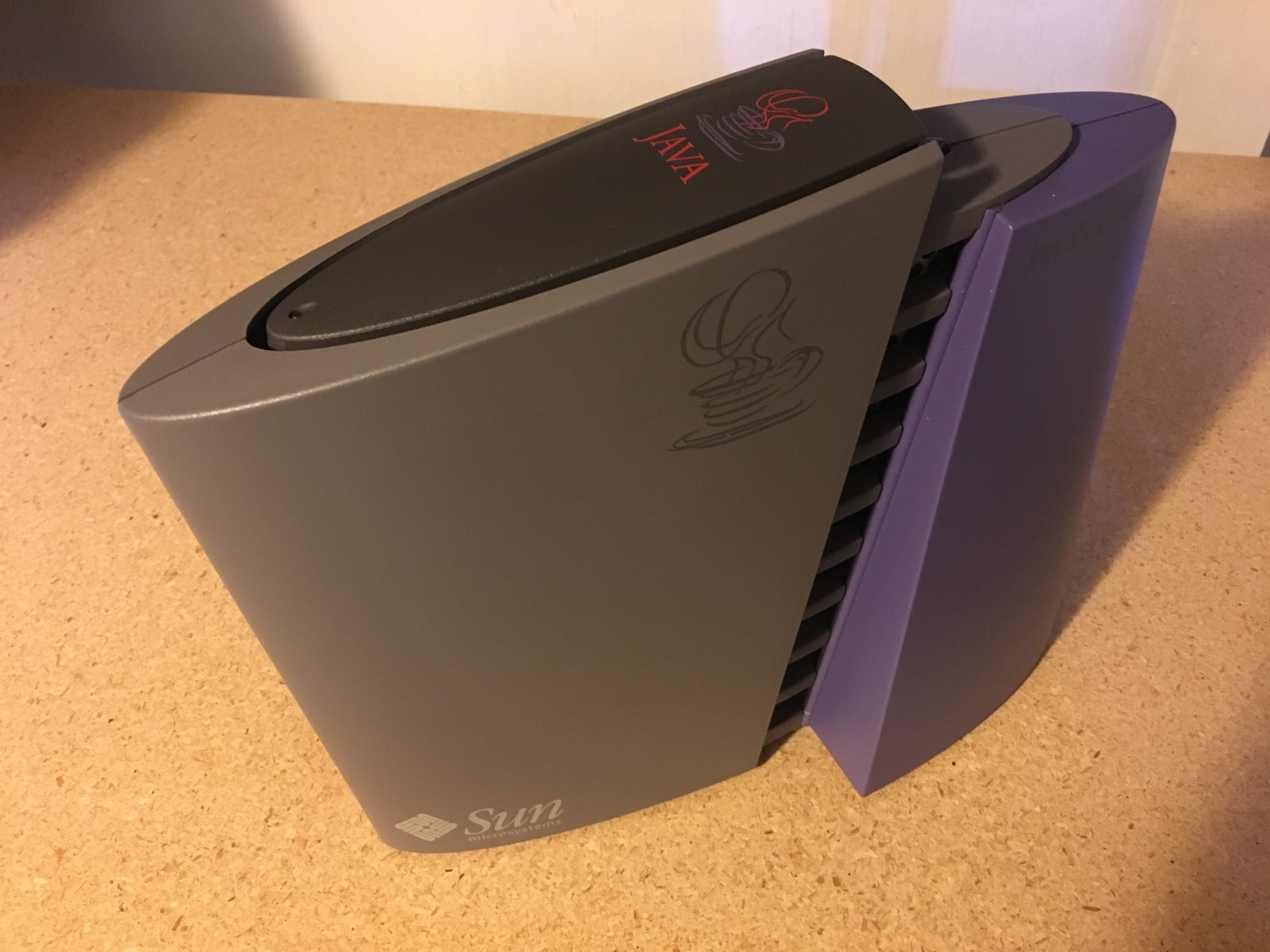
Sun JavaStation-NC

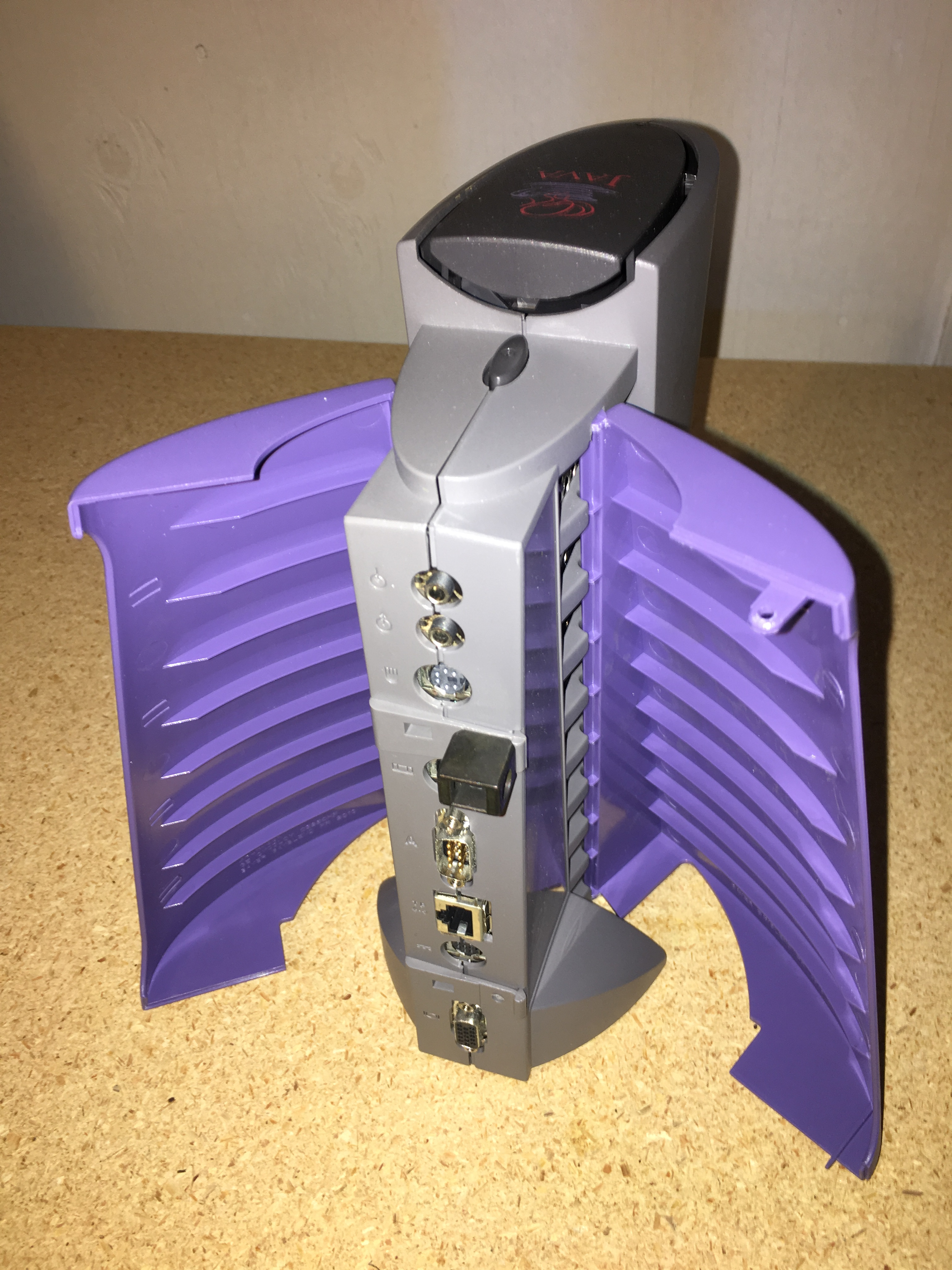
Sun JavaStation-NC (rear view)

The JavaStation was a variant of Sun Microsystems' Network Computer (NC) developed between 1996 and 2000, and intended to run only Java applications.

The hardware is based on the design of the SPARCstation series, Sun's line of UNIX workstations. The JavaStation, as an NC, lacks a hard drive, floppy or CD-ROM drive. It also differs from other Sun systems in having PS/2 keyboard and mouse interfaces and a VGA monitor connector.

== Models ==
There were several models of the JavaStation produced, some being pre-production variants produced in very small numbers.

Production models comprised:

- JavaStation-1 (part number JJ-xx), codenamed Mr. Coffee: based on a 110 MHz MicroSPARC IIe CPU, this was housed in a cuboidal Sun "unidisk" enclosure.
- JavaStation-NC or JavaStation-10 (part number JK-xx) codenamed Krups: a redesigned Mr. Coffee with a 100 MHz MicroSPARC IIep CPU and enhanced video resolution and color capabilities. Krups was housed in a striking curved vertically oriented enclosure.

Models produced only as prototypes or in limited numbers included:

- JavaStation/Fox: a prototype of the Mr Coffee: essentially a repackaged SPARCstation 4 Model 110.
- JavaStation-E (part number JE-xx) codenamed Espresso: a Krups with PCI slots and a non-functional ATA interface in a restyled enclosure.
- Dover: a JavaStation based on PC compatible hardware, with a Cyrix MediaGXm CPU.
- JavaEngine-1: an ATX form-factor version of Krups for embedded systems.
- A 68030-based system designed by Diba, Inc. (later acquired by Sun) circa 1996, which could be considered a very early JavaStation-like system.

In addition, Sun envisioned a third-generation "Super JavaStation" after Krups, with a JavaChip co-processor for native Java bytecode execution. This does not appear to have been produced.

The JavaStation concept was superseded by the Sun Ray series of thin client terminals.

== Operating systems ==
The JavaStation comes with JavaOS in the flash memory, but it is also possible to install Linux or NetBSD on the JavaStation.

== See also ==
- Sun Ray
