= Gridcentric =

Software company based in Canada

Gridcentric, Inc.
- Company type: Private
- Industry: Software
- Founded: 2009
- Headquarters: Toronto, Canada
- Key people: Eric Shefler (CEO); Tim Smith (Co-founder); Adin Scannell (Co-founder); Andres Lagar-Cavilla (Co-founder); Don Pinto (Product Marketing)
- Website: www.gridcentric.com

Gridcentric, Inc. was a software company that provided virtualization technology for datacenters. The company's flagship product, Virtual Memory Streaming (VMS) reduced boot time, memory footprint and operating costs for virtual machines in the cloud.

The company headquarters was in Toronto, Ontario, Canada with offices in Santa Clara, California.

Gridcentric was a privately held company backed by Rogers Ventures, Citrix Startup Accelerator, Investment Accelerator Fund, and Ontario Centers of Excellence. It was taken over by Google in 2014.

Gridcentric supported the OpenStack project and was used by several OpenStack based cloud computing companies including Piston Cloud Computing for building enterprise cloud platforms.,

== History ==
Gridcentric, Inc. was founded in 2009 by Tim Smith, Adin Scannell and Andres Lagar-Cavilla. The technology is derived from a University of Toronto research project called Snowflock. The Snowflock project applied the idea of an operating system fork — a process of self-replication — to cluster management, a widely recognized problem that was proving intractable in the department’s computational biology lab. Gridcentric's technology was used for many purposes including optimizing Virtual Desktop Infrastructure platforms, development, and test server farms and scaling out critical IT services rapidly.

Gridcentric was acquired by Google in 2014.

== See also ==
- Cloud computing
- Cloud infrastructure
- Virtualization
