= Blade PC =

Form of personal computer

A blade PC is a form of client or personal computer (PC). In conjunction with a client access device (usually a thin client) on a user's desk, the supporting blade PC is typically housed in a rack enclosure, usually in a datacenter or specialised environment. Together, they accomplish many of the same functions of a traditional PC, but they also take advantage of many of the architectural achievements pioneered by blade servers.

== Description ==
Like a traditional PC, a blade PC has a CPU, RAM and a hard drive. It may or may not have an integrated graphics sub-system. Some can support multiple hard drives. It is in a “blade” form that plugs into an enclosure. Enclosures offered by current blade PC vendors are similar but not identical. Most have moved the power supplies, cooling fans and some management capabilities from the blade PC to the enclosure. Up to 14 enclosures can be placed in one industry standard 42U rack.

Blade PCs support one or more common operating systems (for instance Microsoft has created a “blade PC” version of their XP and Vista Business operating systems and many Linux distributions are installable). Importantly, these solutions are intended to support one user per discrete device. This is a major difference from server-based computing, which supports multiple users simultaneously using an application hosted on one discrete server (be it a discrete piece of hardware or a discrete virtual machine on a server).

Access to the device is usually achieved via various Virtual Network Computing (VNC), which allows users to log on to the blade PC via a client device (usually a thin client). Once logged on the end user experience is largely the same as if they were logged on to a local PC. It is less effective at delivering multimedia, in part because the audio and video are not synchronized, so in circumstances where there is increasing latency, there is a proportional decrease in the quality of the end user experience. All protocols are negatively impacted by increasing latency between the end user's access device and the blade PC. One of the biggest challenges the blade PC vendors have experienced is how to minimize the impact of latency and deliver an end user experience comparable to that offered by a traditional PC, and there has been a number of new entrants in this sub-category of the blade PC in 2007.

International Data Corporation recognizes blade PCs as a category separate from other types of PCs and has begun issuing forecasts for blade PCs.

== History and vendors ==
ClearCube, a small privately held company based in Austin, Texas, gets credit for creating and popularizing the category. Started in the late 1990s, they have been very aggressive promoting the concept especially in the United States and in vertical markets such as financial traders, hospitals and national defense organizations.

HP was second to the category with the 2004 announcement of their “Consolidated Client Infrastructure” in North America. In contrast to ClearCube, HP emphasized density while minimizing power consumption, which resulted in the ability to put far more blade PCs in an industry standard 42U rack (up to 280). HP's first offering, however, was a Transmeta-based solution, which offered only a marginal end user experience. HP has since migrated to AMD-based blade PCs. Like the other blade PC vendors, HP offers MS RDP with their solutions, and they have announced availability of another protocol called Remote Graphics Software that has some advantages over MS RDP, especially in regard to delivery of three-dimensional and streaming content.

Hitachi offers a blade PC of their own in Japan. It is reportedly only available in Japan. There does not seem to have been any enhancements since it was first introduced in 2005. Though more like the CCI solution than the ClearCube solution, it is less dense and has all cabling out of the front of the unit.

== Comparison ==
Common value proposition of blade PCs relative to traditional PCs:

- Enhanced data security because all data can be maintained in the datacenter and can more easily be saved to a mass storage device, so if the access device is stolen or destroyed the data is not compromised
- Reduced Total Cost of Ownership due to consolidation, standardization, and more redundancy
- Better disaster tolerance for end users because with MS RDP end users can log in from anywhere to their blade PC, so even if their office is quarantined (due to a contagious disease outbreak, for instance), they can continue to have access to their blade PC and their data files so they remain productive

== Design considerations ==
As an alternative to traditional PCs, the blade PC solutions offered by the various vendors are effectively competing with PCs, albeit they are based in datacenters. Therefore, some of the more important design considerations in this category include:

- Maximizing the end user experience (this is a “ticket” to entry – end user experience must be comparable to at least low-end traditional PCs)
- Minimizing acquisition cost (as a result traditional PC components are frequently used rather than more expensive server components)
- Maximizing density (because if these devices are to replace millions of traditional PCs by moving into datacenter they must minimize the amount of expensive datacenters space they require)
- Minimizing power consumption (minimizing power input and heat output in a datacenter is critical to keeping data centers properly cooled and datacenter costs down - see HVAC)
- Similar to traditional PCs to deploy and integrate (ease of integration is critical, or the barriers to adoption will prohibit widespread success for the category)
- Easy to manage with the same tools used for other datacenter based HW and SW (otherwise it becomes onerous extra work)

== Related client solutions ==
- Blade workstation: These solutions tend to be much more expensive than the traditional blade PCs, and befitting their more high-end specs, they are much more capable.
- Virtual PC: Unlike blade PCs, some vendors of virtualization software (such as ESX from VMware) have recently popularized the idea of using a hypervisor such as ESX to create multiple Virtual Machines (VM) that sit on top of the hypervisor, and load a client operating system in each VM. The goal then is to maximize the number of users per server to minimize acquisition cost while not so compromising the end user experience to make it too poor to use. So unlike the blade PC solutions described above, in a virtualized model all end users share the underlying hardware resources.

== See also ==
- Nettop
- Remote Graphics Software
- Blade server
- PCoIP
