= Omnissa Horizon =

Desktop and app virtualization product

- Other names: VMware Horizon, VMware Horizon View, VMware View, VMware Virtual Desktop Manager (VDM)
- Original author: VMware
- Developer: Omnissa
- Stable release: 2506.1 - 8.16.0 - Build Number: 17145568083 / August 22, 2025
- Operating system: Windows, Linux, macOS
- Available in: English, Japanese, French, German, Simplified Chinese, Traditional Chinese, Korean, Spanish, Brazilian Portuguese
- Type: Desktop virtualization
- License: Proprietary
- Website: www.omnissa.com/products/horizon-8/

Omnissa Horizon (formerly called VMware Horizon, VMware Horizon View, VMware View) is a commercial desktop and app virtualization product originally developed by VMware, Inc for Microsoft Windows, Linux and macOS operating systems.

It was first sold under the name VMware Virtual Desktop Manager (VDM), but with the release of version 3.0.0 in 2008 it was changed to "VMware View". The name was updated to "Horizon View" with the launch of version 6 in April 2014 and then referred to as "VMware Horizon" to represent desktop and app virtualization.

Broadcom completed its acquisition of VMware in November 2023, and then in May 2024 spun out the End-User Computing division, including Horizon, into a standalone entity called Omnissa pending the sale to KKR.

== Features ==
Omnissa Horizon provides virtual desktop and app capabilities to users utilizing VMware's virtualization technology. A desktop operating system - typically Microsoft Windows - runs within a virtual machine on a hypervisor. VMware Horizon product has a number of components which are required to provide the virtual desktops, including:

- VMware vSphere Hypervisor (ESXi with a vSphere license)
- VMware vCenter Server (management of virtualization environment)
- View Composer (advanced View management, with automation and cloning)
- View Manager (administration of the View Environment)
- View Client (communication between View and the desktop OS)
- VMware ThinApp (application virtualization)
- View Persona Management (user profile management)
- vShield Endpoint (offloaded desktop antivirus)

Although VMware licenses vSphere hypervisor per physical CPU-socket, it licenses VMware View per concurrent desktop. The bundled hypervisor, vSphere for Desktops, is functionally equivalent to vSphere Enterprise Plus.

VMware View has two licensing options, Enterprise and Premier. Enterprise comes with vSphere for Desktops, vCenter Server, and View Manager, and has an MSRP of $150 per concurrent desktop. View Composer, Persona Management, vShield Endpoint, and ThinApp are included in the Premier edition at an MSRP of $250 per concurrent desktop.

In order to transport the desktop resources to users, keyboard, video, mouse and other interactions travel over a network connection. VMware View supports the VMware Blast Extreme, Microsoft RDP, and the Teradici PCoIP protocols.

=== Horizon Client ===
Omnissa Horizon Client
- Other names: VMware Horizon Client, VMware Horizon View Client, VMware View Client
- Original author: VMware
- Developer: Omnissa
- Stable release: 2503
- Operating system: Windows, Linux, macOS, iOS, Android, ChromeOS
- Available in: English, German, French, Japanese, Simplified Chinese, Korean, Traditional Chinese, Spanish
- Type: Desktop virtualization, Thin client
- License: Commercial, proprietary with open-source bits
- Website: customerconnect.omnissa.com/downloads/info/slug/desktop_end_user_computing/omnissa_horizon_clients/8

Users establish client connections to VMware View sessions by running the VMware View Client, through a web browser using HTML5, or using a thin client that supports the protocols in use. The VMware View client supports Windows, macOS, Android, and Linux, while ChromeOS is able to connect through the web browser.

Ubuntu 12.10 can login to VMware View desktops directly from the login screen.

== Versions ==
=== Horizon ===
Version release history:

- VMware View 3.1.3 (May 5, 2009)
- VMware View 4 (November 9, 2009)
- VMware View 5.1 (May 16, 2012)
- VMware View 5.1.1 (August 16, 2012)
- VMware View 5.1.2 (December 13, 2012)
- VMware View 5.1.3 (March 14, 2013)
- VMware View 5.2 (October 4, 2012)
- VMware View 5.3 (November 21, 2013)
- VMware View 5.3.1 (March 11, 2014)
- VMware View 5.3.2 (June 24, 2014)
- VMware View 5.3.3 (November 25, 2014)
- VMware View 5.3.4 (March 17, 2015)
- VMware View 5.3.5 (September 10, 2015)
- VMware View 5.3.6 (March 1, 2016)

VMware Horizon 6.0 (June 19, 2014)

- VMware Horizon 6.0.1 (September 9, 2014)
- VMware Horizon 6.0.2 (December 9, 2014)
- VMware Horizon 6.1 (March 12, 2015)
- VMware Horizon 6.1.1 (June 4, 2015)
- VMware Horizon 6.2 (September 3, 2015)
- VMware Horizon 6.2.1 (December 8, 2015)
- VMware Horizon 6.2.2 (February 4, 2016)
- VMware Horizon 6.2.3 (July 21, 2016)

VMware Horizon 7.0 (March 22, 2016)

- VMware Horizon 7.0.1 (June 16, 2016)
- VMware Horizon 7.0.2 (September 15, 2016)
- VMware Horizon 7.0.3 (December 8, 2016)
- VMware Horizon 7.1 (March 16, 2017)
- VMware Horizon 7.2 (Jun 20, 2017)
- VMware Horizon 7.3.2 (November 20, 2017)
- VMware Horizon 7.4 (Jan 04, 2018)
- VMware Horizon 7.5 (May 29, 2018) This is the first Extended Service Branch (ESB). ESBs will receive three planned periodic Service Updates (SPs) – 6 months, 9 months and 15 months after the base version release.
- VMware Horizon 7.5.1 (July 19, 2018)
- VMware Horizon 7.6 (Sep 6, 2018)
- VMware Horizon 7.7 (Dec 13, 2018)
- VMware Horizon 7.8 (March 14, 2019)
- VMware Horizon 7.9 (Jul 02, 2019)
- VMware Horizon 7.10 (Sep 17, 2019) This is an ESB release.
- VMware Horizon 7.11 (Dec 12, 2019) VMware announces that Horizon Administrator (FLASH based) will be deprecated in early 2020. VMware recommends using Horizon Console (HTML5 based).
- VMware Horizon 7.12 (March 17, 2020)
- VMware Horizon 7.13 (Oct 15, 2020) This is the last significant release of Horizon 7. The end of general support for Horizon 7 is March 2021.
- VMware Horizon 7.13.1 (May 25, 2021)

VMware Horizon 8.0 (Announced Aug 6, 2020)

VMware Horizon 8

Version	General Availability	End of General Support	End of Technical Guidance	ESB Release
2006	2020-08-11	2025-08-11	2027-08-11	
2012	2021-01-07	2024-01-07	2025-01-07	
2103	2021-03-23	2024-03-23	2025-03-23	
2106	2021-07-15	2024-07-15	2025-07-15	
2111	2021-11-30	2024-11-30	2025-11-30	
2203	2022-01-07	2025-01-07	2026-01-07	
DaaS On Prem 9.1	2021-01-07	2024-01-07	2025-01-07	
2206	2022-07-19	2025-07-19	2026-07-19	
2209	2022-10-20	2025-10-20	2026-10-20	
2212	2023-01-12	2026-01-12	2027-01-12	
2303	2023-03-30	2026-03-30	2027-03-30	
2306	2023-07-06	2026-07-06	2027-07-06	
2309	2023-10-26	2026-10-26	2027-10-26	
2312	2024-01-23	2027-01-23	2028-01-23	Yes
2406	2024-07-25	2027-07-25	2028-07-25	Yes
2412	2024-01-28	2027-01-28	2028-01-28	No
DaaS 9.2.0	2023-04-27	2026-04-27	2027-04-27	
Legend: Unsupported Supported Latest version Preview version Future version

=== Horizon Client ===
The Client software is known as Client Agent Release Train (CART). CART it is on a separate release cycle than VMware View/Horizon but often coincides with it.

Horizon Clients

- CART 5.0 (Mar 18, 2019)
- CART 5.1 (Jul 02, 2019)
- CART 5.2 (Sep 17, 2019)
- CART 5.3 (Dec 12, 2019)
- CART 5.4 (March 17, 2020)
- CART 5.5 (Oct 15, 2020)

Horizon Clients - Naming convention changed to denote the year and month of build release

- CART 2006 (Aug 11, 2020)
- CART 2009 (Oct 15, 2020)
- CART 2012 (Jan 07, 2021)
- CART 2103 (Mar 23, 2021)
- CART 2106 (Jul 15, 2021)
- CART 2111 (Nov 29, 2021)
- CART 2203 (Apr 04, 2022)
- CART 2206 (July 19, 2022)
- CART 2209 (Oct 20, 2022)
- CART 2212 (Jan 12, 2023)
- CART 2303 (Mar 31, 2023)
- CART 2306 (July 10, 2023)
- CART 2309 (Oct 26, 2023)
- CART 2312 (Jan 21, 2024)
