= Amdek =

Computer peripheral company (1977–1986)

Amdek Corporation
- Formerly: Leedex Corporation (1977–1981)
- Type: Private
- Industry: Computers
- Founded: 1977; 49 years ago in Elk Grove, Illinois
- Founders: Go Sugiura; Ted McCracken
- Defunct: 1986; 40 years ago (as an independent company)
- Fate: Acquired by Wyse Technology
- Parent: Roland Corporation (c. 1981–1983)

Amdek Corporation (formerly Leedex Corporation) was an American computer peripheral and system manufacturer active from 1977 to the mid-1990s. The company was known for its standalone computer monitors compatible with a wide array of systems from the early microcomputer era to the personal computer age. According to PC World in 1994, "Amdek was once the name in PC monitors. Chances are the monochrome monitors most of us used once carried the Amdek label." In the early 1980s, the company was majority owned by the Roland Corporation's Taiwanese subsidiary; in 1986, after a brief period of independence, the company was acquired by Wyse Technology, a maker of computer terminals, who continued the Amdek brand into at least 1995.

== History ==
=== 1977–1986 ===
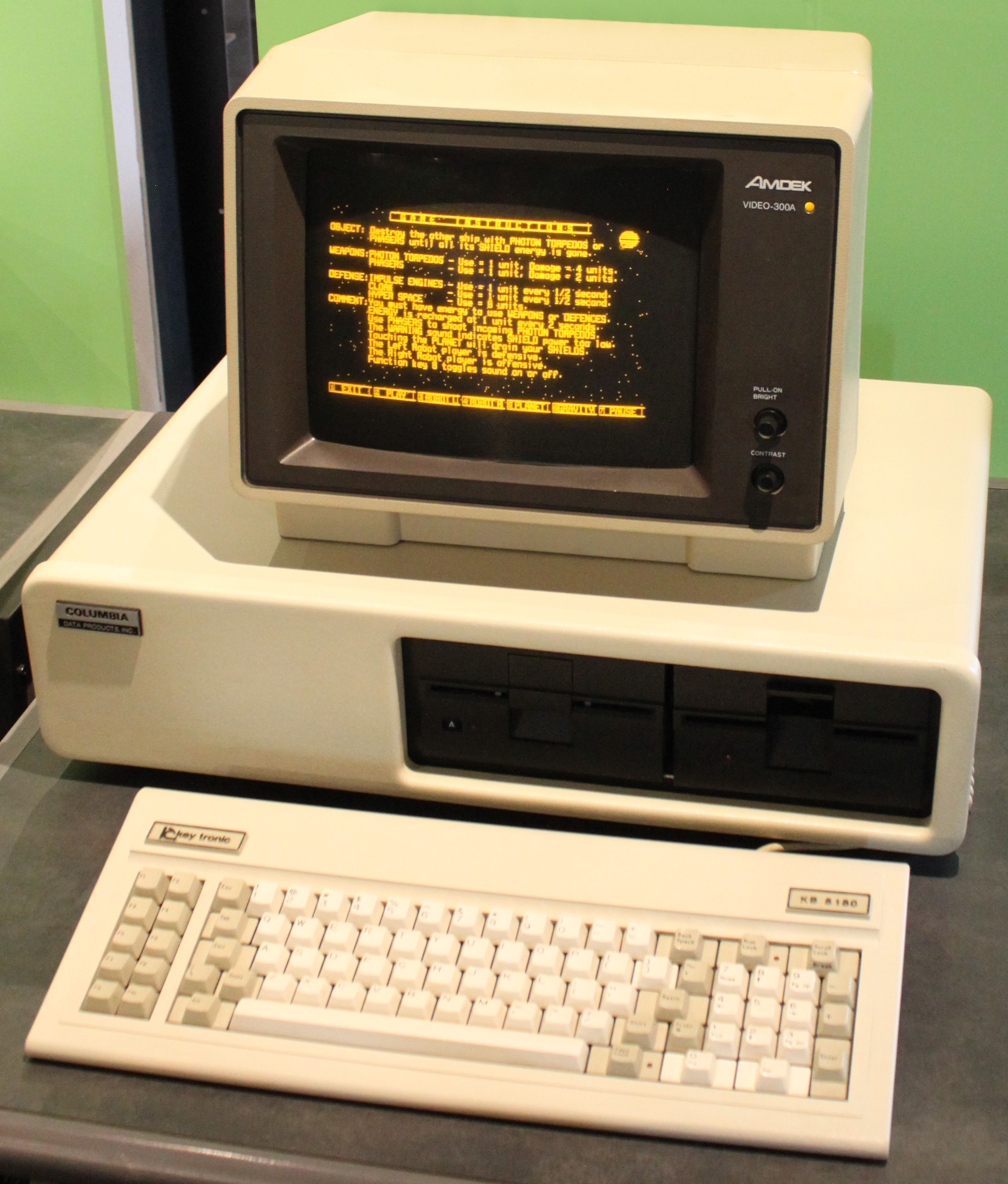
Amber-phosphor Amdek monitor sitting on top of a Columbia Data Products MPC 1600 (the first true IBM PC clone)

Amdek was founded in 1977 by Go Sugiura (born 1936 in Osaka, Japan) and Ted McCracken. Before starting Amdek, Sugiura had graduated university with a Bachelor of Economics in the 1950s after moving to the United States (where he learned English); worked as a consumer electronics importer in Caracas, Venezuela (where he learned Spanish), in 1960; started his own business importing steel from Japan in Venezuela later in the 1960s; and worked as U.S. sales representative for Sakata, a Japanese semiconductor fabricator, in the early 1970s. At Sakata he bartered with the company's executives to be allowed to use the Sakata trademark for his own independent trading company, Sakata International, headed by himself. Sakata agreed, but almost as soon as Sakata International began it was merged back into its namesake parent, because the demand for Sakata products in the United States was too high for Sugiura to pay in advance with his allotted capital. Still possessing the urge to have his own company, as a side job Sugiura incorporated Leedex as an importer of car radio components. A manufacturer in Ohio previously established under the name Leedex threatened a trademark infringement suit against Sugiura, prompting him to change the name of his company to Amdek. According to Ikutaro Kakehashi in 2002, the founder of Japanese instrument maker Roland Corporation who would later overtake Amdek for a time, the name stood for Analog, Music, Digital, Electronics, and Kits. Sugiura however explained in 1984 that the name was chosen as a random combination of syllables.

With the rise of the microcomputer in the late 1970s, Sugiura wanted to enter the industry but lacked the personal experience with computers and knowledge of electrical engineering. He contacted Ted McCracken, a friend and professor of computer science at the University of Missouri who had met Sugiura at a foreclosure of another electronics company, for whom Sugiura was a creditor of the company and McCracken was an actuary at the bank handling liquidation proceedings. McCracken was the first dealer of computers in the state of Missouri to import the Apple II microcomputer. As the two began talking about computers during the year, Sugiura became aware of the lack of aftermarket monitors for these early microcomputers. In 1977 or 1978, Sugiura traveled to Taiwan and found a model of computer terminal with a monochrome cathode-ray tube he liked; meanwhile McCracken observed an executive of Apple Computer demonstrate the Apple II at a computer show. The two discussed their findings, McCracken suggesting that Sugiura repurpose the terminal as a monochrome composite monitor for the Apple II, to be shown at a future computer show. At a summer 1978 computer show in Texas, Sugiura spent $375 for his half of a booth shared by another person. Despite having only one sample unit on display at the end of his half of the booth's table, the Amdek monitor garnered significant interest by the showgoers. Later in 1978, Sugiura ordered 500 units from the supplier of the data terminal—units which comprised shells of the terminal including the tube but without the circuitry for the data terminal—and sold each for $129, $50 less than the only other aftermarket computer monitor available. By 1981, the company was selling between 2,000 and 3,000 monochrome monitors per month.

In 1981, Amdek released their first color computer monitor, based on a chassis manufactured by Hitachi and an adapter circuit board designed by McCracken allowing it to be used with the Apple II. Although at $1,000 it was considerably more expensive than the company's other offerings, it proved immensely popular among buyers of the IBM Personal Computer, as for the first year and a half of the PC's existence, IBM provided no color monitor option. Amdek sold over 600,000 units of the color monitor by 1984.

In the early 1980s, Roland Corporation's Taiwanese subsidiary acquired a majority stake in Amdek and began selling guitar pedal kits under the Amdek name. Meanwhile, the company expanded to plotters and computer speakers as well as continuing their computer monitor business. At one point in the early 1980s, according to Kakehashi, Amdek was so hugely popular in their monitor business that the name became a genericized catch-all for any aftermarket computer monitor among the computer-buying public. In 1983 Roland relinquished their stake in Amdek, and the company was once again independent. That year, the company posted $50 million in sales and employed 65, with headquarters in Elk Grove, Illinois and branch offices in Dallas, Texas, and Costa Mesa, California. Despite remaining a market leader in monitors into the mid-1980s—in 1986 it supplied half of all monochrome monitors on the market—in 1985 the company posted significant losses, which Sugiura blamed partially on failed forays into other computer peripherals. Rumors began circulating that Micro-Term, a Fenton, Missouri–based terminal manufacturer, and an unnamed Japanese electronics company were to acquire Amdek, although the company shut down such rumors to the press.

=== 1986–1995 ===
In January 1986, Wyse Technology, a terminal manufacturer in San Jose, California, agreed to acquire Amdek Corporation for $7.2 million in a stock swap. The acquisition terms were later reevaluated to $8.5 million in shares. In 1987, H. L. "Sparky" Sparks, formerly of IBM where he helped established the first dealer networks for the IBM PC, was named president of Wyse's Amdek division. Under his auspices he led Amdek to release its first computer systems: a series of IBM PC compatibles based on the 8088, 80286 and 80386 processors. In 1988, Sparks resigned, citing differences with Wyse's upper management. Michael P. Richman was named as his replacement.

Between then and the mid-1990s, the division lay largely dormant, with PC World noting in 1994 that "the few new products it has introduced have been out of step with the rest of the monitor market". In 1994 Wyse staged a comeback of the Amdek name with several new models released that year—one monochrome model and three "thoroughly up-to-date" color monitors, all compliant with the EPA's Energy Star efficiency standard. Wyse continued to sell Amdek monitors until at least 1995.
