= MPC 1600 =

First fully IBM PC–compatible system

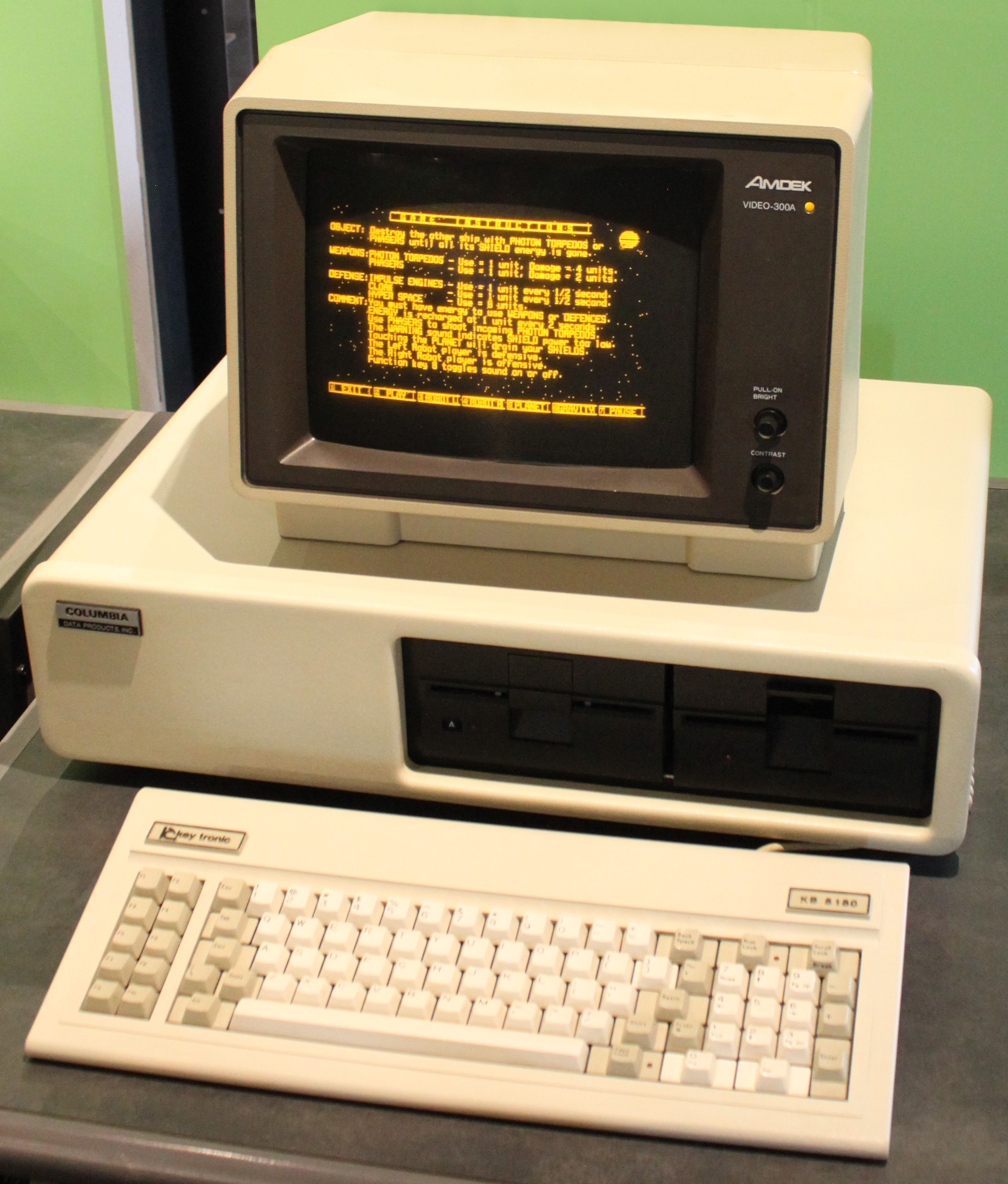
- Columbia Data Products' MPC 1600, the first commercially released IBM PC clone, with an Amdek monitor and a Key Tronic keyboard
- Also known as: Multi-Personal Computer
- Developer: Columbia Data Products
- Manufacturer: Columbia Data Products
- Type: Personal computer (desktop)
- Released: June 1982; 43 years ago
- Lifespan: 1982–1985
- Introductory price: US$2,995
- Discontinued: July 1985; 40 years ago
- Operating system: MS-DOS, CP/M-86, MP/M-86, OASIS, Xenix
- CPU: Intel 8088 at 4.77 MHz
- Memory: 128 KB (1 MB max.)
- Storage: Two 5.25-inch FDDs
- Graphics: Color Graphics Adapter
- Sound: PC speaker 1-channel square-wave/1-bit digital (PWM-capable)
- Connectivity: RS-232, parallel, monitor, keyboard
- Backward compatibility: IBM Personal Computer

The Multi-Personal Computer (MPC), better known as the MPC 1600, is a line of desktop personal computers released by Columbia Data Products (CDP) starting in 1982. The original MPC, released in June 1982, was the first commercially released computer system that was fully compatible with the IBM Personal Computer (IBM PC).

== Background ==
Columbia Data Products (CDP) was a small computer systems manufacturer founded by William Diaz in the mid-1970s in Columbia, Maryland. The company had been marketing microcomputers for over five years before releasing the MPC in 1982. Examples of the company's early systems included the Commander line of Z80-based microcomputers.

In August 1981, the computing giant IBM released the IBM Personal Computer (IBM PC), their first mass-market microcomputer, to intense commercial interest and industry speculation. It was notable for being an open standard unlike anything IBM had released previously: it used off-the-shelf hardware such as the Intel 8088 microprocessor; ran an operating system (IBM PC DOS) developed by a third-party company, Microsoft; and had a computer bus (later dubbed Industry Standard Architecture, or ISA) whose specification IBM made open to third-party hardware vendors who wanted to release expansion cards and other hardware. Recognizing that this culture of openness might allow them to engineer a fully compatible clone of the IBM PC, Columbia Data Products set out to manufacture such a system "almost immediately" after the PC's August 1981 introduction, in the words of the company's core staff. CDP were deep in development of another microcomputer based on an entirely different architecture but decided to cancel it in favor of producing a clone of the IBM PC.

== Development ==
CDP's IBM PC clone was engineered by a team headed by David Howse, CDP's manager of hardware design; Charlie Montague, the company's director of technical services; Bob Mikkelsen, the company's office manager of programming; Don Rein, the company's manager of software engineering; and Dick Mathews, CDP's VP of planning and development. Howse was the principal designer behind the hardware for the computer. The company borrowed the design of the IBM PC's motherboard largely wholesale, using the same ISA bus, Intel 8088 microprocessor, Intel 8288 bus controller, NEC μPD765 floppy controller, and other off-the-shelf integrated circuits used by the IBM PC. CDP doubled the stock amount of RAM of the IBM PC to 128 KB while adding more expansion slots and offering dual 5.25-inch floppy disk drives for the base model. Because of the additional expansion slots, the motherboard for the computer was substantially larger than that of the IBM PC's, measuring at 10 by 20 inches (25 by 51 cm). CDP sourced a cost-reduced clone of the original 83-key IBM PC keyboard from Key Tronic of Spokane, Washington; while featuring an identical layout, it lacked the tactility provided by the IBM PC keyboard's buckling spring design.

While cloning the IBM PC's hardware was easy for CDP, mimicking the PC's BIOS ROM required planning out a clean-room design to avoid infringing IBM's copyright on their BIOS and thus was more complex. CDP had to pay careful attention to how their BIOS initialized its memory map and interrupt table in order to ensure functional equivalency with the IBM PC, the source of much trial and error and expense because of the numerous third-party expansion cards and software CDP had to test against. On the other hand, providing a compatible operating system was significantly easier for CDP because IBM's contract with Microsoft allowed the latter to freely license their MS-DOS operating system, which was the basis of IBM PC DOS, to third-party companies. CDP were able to secure a license to the source code for MS-DOS, incorporating the same API while modifying it to recognize their computer's RAM disk, on which their clone of GW-BASIC (renamed BASICA) resides, while adding software flow control to the computer's number-0 RS-232 serial port and redirecting textual parallel printer data to the aforementioned serial port.

While the IBM PC could be used as a multi-user machine, the vast majority of PCs were purchased by customers intending to use the PC as single-user machines, with IBM devoting the majority of their marketing efforts toward this demographic. CDP meanwhile sought to stress the multi-user capability of their clone and thus gave it the name Multi-Personal Computer (MPC). To this end, the company offered the MPC with several multi-user operating systems, including Digital Research's MP/M-86, Microsoft's Xenix, and Phase One Systems's OASIS, in addition the single-user MS-DOS as well as Digital Research's CP/M-86 that it shipped with. In addition to the operating system, CDP bundled the MPCs with a large amount of productivity software from Perfect Software.

== Specifications and variants ==
The Multi-Personal Computer initially came in three variants: the MPC 1600-1, featuring two 5.25-inch, double-density floppy disk drives (FDDs) manufactured by Tandon; the MPC 1600-2, with one 5.25-inch FDD and one 5-MB hard disk drive (HDD); and the MPC 1600-3, with one 5.25-inch FDD and one 10-MB HDD. In 1983, the company introduced the MPC 1600-4, with one 5.25-inch FDD and one 23-MB HDD.

All models in the line came with 128 KB of RAM stock, expandable to 1 MB. In addition, all models in the line feature eight ISA expansion slots, each one supporting up to full-sized 8-bit ISA cards. Although it made the chassis of the MPC several inches wider than the IBM PC, the addition of three more ISA slots was a major selling point for CDP. On the IBM PC, the five expansion slots were quickly taken up by serial, parallel, and floppy, and graphics controller that most purchasers bought along with their computer, leaving only one or two spare slots on the board. (Note: Even after IBM introduced the successor IBM Personal Computer/XT in 1983 with eight expansion slots, two of the slots on the XT were only half-length.) While the MPC 1600-1 did not ship with a hard drive, CDP included the same combination floppy–hard disk controller card with the machine as the higher-end models, for users who wanted to add an aftermarket HDD. By combining the hard disk controller and the floppy controller on the same card, this freed up an additional ISA slot; on both the original IBM PC and the PC XT, the floppy controller is housed on a separate card. Just as well, the MPC integrates two RS-232 serial ports and the parallel port (and associated circuitry) on the motherboard, freeing up yet more slots compared to IBM's implementation. Unlike the IBM PC, however, the MPC 1600 series does not offer sockets on the motherboards for expanding the RAM of the systems. Instead, the user must purchase an aftermarket RAM expansion card, which takes up one of the eight ISA slots.

CDP offered a graphics card as an option for the MPC. A clone of IBM's Color Graphics Adapter (CGA), CDP's card is capable of displaying 1-bit monochrome graphics at a resolution of 640 by 200 pixels; 1-bit monochrome or 4-color graphics at a resolution of 320 by 200 pixels; and 40- and 80-column text at 25 lines from a palette of 16 colors. Unlike IBM, CDP did not sell monitors alongside their computer systems, although their manuals recommended monochrome monitors manufactured by Amdek and color monitors by Princeton Graphics Systems. As an alternative to a graphics card, users can plug a dumb terminal into one of the MPC's spare serial ports, with the MPC's BIOS providing an interactive serial console to the terminal. With aftermarket serial expansion cards (contemporaneously sold by CDP), up to eight simultaneous users can interact with the MPC using dumb terminals.

By 1984, CDP had reduced the line to four computers: the MPC 1600-1; the MPC 1600-4 (revised to featuring only a 10-MB HDD instead of the 23-MB HDD it originally had); the MPC 1600-1V; and the MPC 1600-4V. The latter two included the aforementioned CGA-compatible graphics adapter designed by CDP.

== Release and sales ==
Columbia Data Systems unveiled the MPC 1600 at their booth at the National Computer Conference (NCC) in Houston, Texas, in June 1982. CDP's booth drew a massive crowd at the convention, attracting the interest of interested buyers and IBM employees alike. By the end of CDP's presence at the NCC, the company had secured international orders for the MPC worth $10 million across 200 dealers in Europe and South America.

By the end of the summer of 1982, the first several thousand units of the MPC had shipped. It was the first commercially released computer system that was fully compatible with the IBM PC, (Note: Although Compaq is popularly thought to have released the first IBM PC–compatible computer system with the Compaq Portable, that system was not announced to the public until November 1982 and was not released to the public until March 1983.) with PC World magazine recognizing it as the "clone that other clones cloned ... helping to define the Intel-and-Microsoft platform that dominates to this day". Within a few months of the MPC's release, dozens of other computer companies had announced their own clones of the IBM Personal Computer, this category of computer capturing most of the attention at the 1982 COMDEX/Fall at the Las Vegas Convention Center. That year's COMDEX also saw the announcement of PC World, the first magazine dedicated to IBM PC compatible market that sprung from the MPC.

While the MPC was the first clone of the IBM PC, Compaq soon overtook the market for compatibles after announcing their Compaq Portable at the 1982 COMDEX/Fall, releasing the first units in 1983. Unlike the MPC, the Compaq Portable is, as the name suggests, a portable version of the IBM PC, with the monitor, keyboard, and system components housed in the same chassis and carried by handle. In response to the Compaq Portable, in mid-1983 CDP released the Columbia VP, a portable version of the MPC 1600.

By the end of 1983, Columbia Data Systems was the third largest manufacturer of IBM PCs and compatibles, behind IBM and Compaq. While it had captured only roughly one percent of the global personal computer market in the fiscal year 1983, the company generated sales of $56.2 million during the same period, up from $9.4 million in 1982. This steady growth prompted Columbia Data Systems to file its initial public offering and become a public company on the Nasdaq in 1983. At its peak in 1984, the company employeed 900 workers and was approaching $100 million in revenue.

Competition in the compatibles market began mounting in the summer of 1984, however, as several companies—including IBM—announced massive price cuts on their computer systems, while other large electronics corporations such as AT&T began entering the market for PC compatibles at the same time. Furthermore, in August 1984, CDP posted a $2 million quarterly loss, evidencing diminished interest in the MPC 1600 line, which prompted layoffs at the company's Maryland and Puerto Rico factories as well as the cancellation of the raising of a new production facility in Ireland. Conditions at CDP deteriorated quickly, and the company was delisted from the Nasdaq in April 1985. A month later, the company filed for Chapter 11 bankruptcy, and by July that year the company had stopped producing computers altogether. Finally, in November 1985, the company's bankruptcy was converted to Chapter 7 after its investors failed to turn up a reorganization plan for the company, a bankruptcy judge ordering them to liquidate CDP's assets. In April 1986, Godfather's Used Computer Syndicate, a long-time vendor of CDP's MPC line based in Forest City, Florida, acquired CDP's intellectual property and assets and revived the Columbia Data Products name, selling off the company's remaining unsold inventory while announcing new PC compatibles.

== Reception ==
In May 1983, Future Computing ranked Columbia and Compaq computers as "Best" in the category of "Operationally Compatible", its highest tier of PC compatibility. PC Magazine in June 1983 criticized the MPC's documentation, but reported that it had very good hardware and software compatibility with the IBM PC. Writing retrospectively in 2006, PC World called the MPC 1600 the ninth greatest personal computer of all time.
