= User virtualization =

Independent management of all aspects of the user on the desktop environment

User virtualization refers to the independent management of all aspects of the user on the desktop environment. User virtualization decouples a user's profile, settings and data from the operating system and stores this information into a centralized data share either in the data center or cloud. User virtualization solutions provide consistent and seamless working environments across a range of application delivery mechanisms. Although user virtualization is most closely associated with desktop virtualization, this technology can also be used to manage user profiles on physical desktops. As the range of currently used operating systems expands, and the use of multiple devices by workers to perform their jobs escalates, user virtualization can support the creation of a "follow-me" identity that will allow access to a workspace without being tied into only a single device or a single location.

== User virtualization for virtual desktops ==
For virtualized desktop environments, user virtualization represents a fundamental change in how the corporate desktop is constructed, delivered and managed. The user’s personality is decoupled from the operating system and applications, managed independently and applied to a desktop as needed without scripting, group policies or use of user profiles – regardless of how the desktop is being delivered (physical, virtual, cloud, etc.).

== User virtualization for terminal servers ==
For server based computing environments, user virtualization enables IT to have more control over the shared environment, optimize infrastructure needs and ensure an optimal experience for their users. With application entitlement, unauthorized applications are blocked without the need for complex scripts or high-maintenance lists, providing protection from unknown executables and ensuring compliance with Microsoft licensing.

== User personality ==
User personality is a combination of corporate policy and user personalization. Policy is used to set up and maintain a user desktop session. Policy also ensures a user session remains compliant by controlling application access, locking down or removing operating system and application functions, as well as self-healing essential files, folders, processes, services and registry settings. Personalization constitutes any change a user makes to his or her desktop.

== User persona ==
User persona is another term used interchangeably with user personality or user personalization.
