= Teradici =

Canadian software company

Teradici Corporation
- Type: Subsidiary
- Industry: Computer software, Computer hardware
- Founded: British Columbia, Canada, 2004
- Founder: Dan Cordingley; Dave Hobbs; Ken Unger; Maher Fahmi
- Headquarters: Burnaby, British Columbia, Canada
- Products: PCoIP Protocol; PCoIP Zero Client SOC; PCoIP Workstation 1:1 Host SOC; APEX 2800 Server Offload; PCoIP Management Console
- Number of employees: 200+
- Parent: HP Inc.
- Website: teradici.com at the Wayback Machine (archived 2017-09-18)

Teradici Corporation was a privately held software company founded in 2004, which was acquired by HP Inc. in October 2021. Teradici initially developed a protocol (PCoIP) for compressing and decompressing images and sound when remotely accessing blade servers, and implemented it in hardware. This technology was later expanded to thin clients/zero clients for general Virtual Desktop Infrastructure. Teradici's protocol or hardware is used by HP, Dell subsidiary Wyse, Amulet Hotkey, Samsung, Amazon Web Services, Fujitsu, and VMware.

On 27 July 2021, HP Inc announced that it had signed a definitive agreement to acquire Teradici on undisclosed terms, with the deal set to close in calendar Q4, 2021.

On 13 April 2026, HP Inc announced that HP Anyware will be discontinued by December 2028.

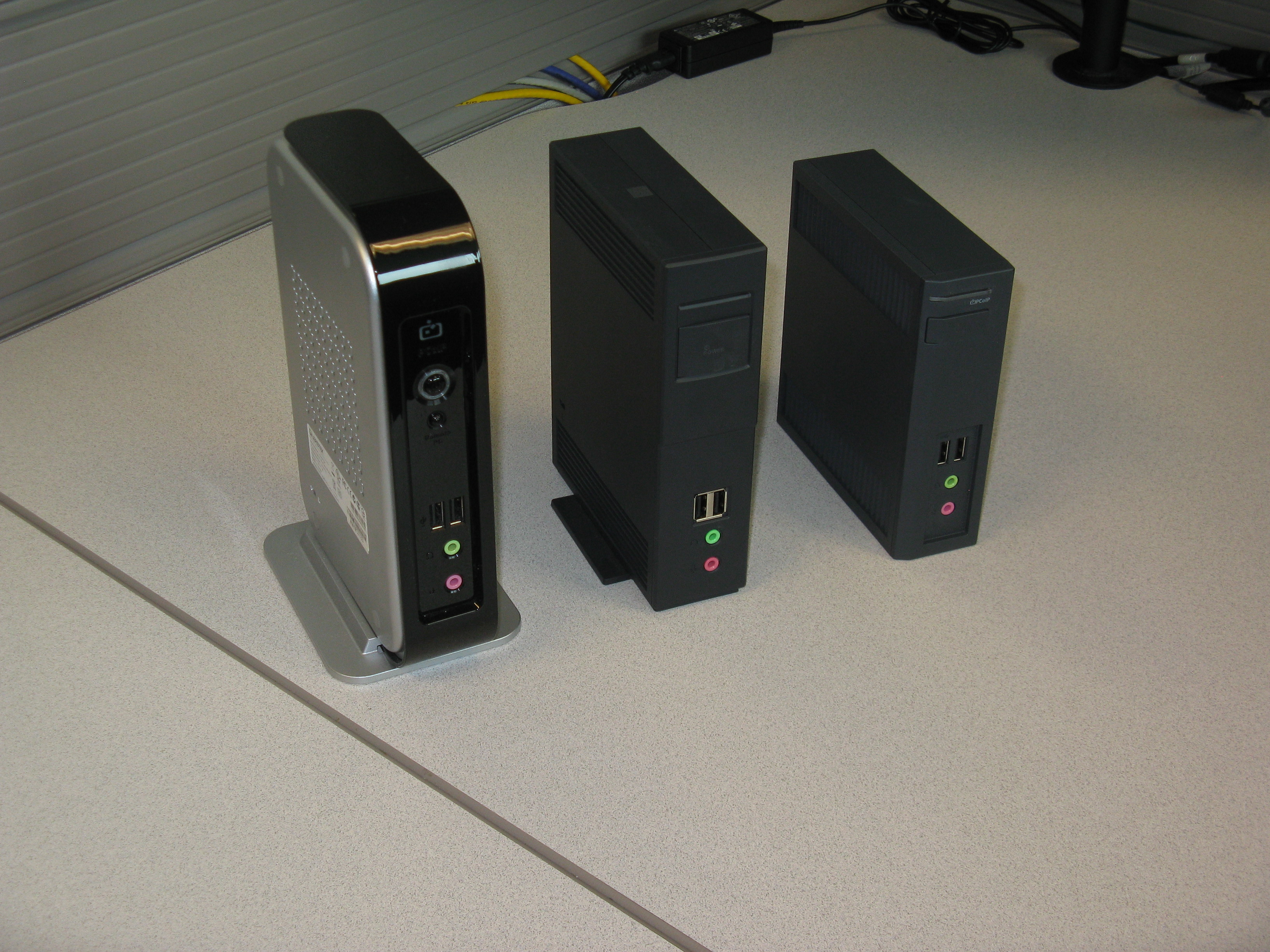
Front shot Teradici PCoIP zero clients. From left to right Tera1, Tera2 (four ports) and Tera2 (two ports)

== History ==
Teradici was founded in 2004 by Dan Cordingley, Dave Hobbs, Ken Unger and Maher Fahmi. It operated in stealth mode until 2007 when they announced their first products, a blade server card and a small hockey puck shaped client, using a proprietary chip which implemented the PCoIP protocol. In 2008, VMware announced it was licensing Teradici's PCoIP protocol. Teradici developed a software implementation of PCoIP, which VMware started shipping in VMware View 4.

The Teradici name originated from a previous company the founders were incubating. That company's product involved a 100-gigabit data center networking device. One-tenth of a tera is a deci, but "Teradeci" didn't roll off the tongue. "Teradici" was unique, sounded better and the domain name was available at the time.

== PCoIP protocol ==
PC-over-IP (PCoIP) is a proprietary remote display protocol developed by Teradici. The protocol is available in hardware and in software. In 2008, VMware licensed Teradici's PCoIP protocol, and supports it in VMware Horizon View. In 2013 Amazon licensed the PCoIP protocol for use in AWS Amazon Workspaces.

PCoIP is a UDP-based protocol that is host rendered, multi-codec and dynamically adaptive. Images rendered on the server are captured as pixels, compressed and encoded and then sent to the client for decryption and decompression. Depending on the image, different codecs are used to encode the pixels sent since techniques to compress video images differ in effectiveness compared to those for text. The protocol also dynamically adapts its encoding based on the available bandwidth. In low-bandwidth environments it uses lossy compression where a highly compressed image is quickly delivered, followed by additional data to refine that image, a process termed "build to perceptually lossless". The default is to use lossless compression which is used when there is minimal network congestion or when explicitly configured, as might be required for scenarios where image fidelity is more important than conserving bandwidth, e.g. for medical imaging.

=== Comparing PCoIP and RDP ===
- Using PCoIP and RDP as a VPN: both PCoIP and RDP protocols can be used in place of a company’s Virtual Private Network, when a corporate firewall is not available or is deactivated.
- High security and encryption level in connections: using a corporate DMZ, the users can make secure and encrypted connections to Access Points or servers via either PCoIP or RDP.
- Security with AES: Both PCoIP and RDP support Advanced Encryption Standard 128-bit by default, adding an extra layer of security in connections. Although, you can change the encryption key cipher to AES-256 in PCoIP.
- Bandwidth reduction: This capability is available on PCoIP protocol in order to optimize the bandwidth usage on WAN and LAN to increase its speed. Bandwidth will be evaluated by Remote Desktop Commander to track the RDP number which depends on your setting (color, depth, etc.).

== Products and solutions ==
=== OEM products ===
- PCoIP Zero Client SoC (System on a Chip): SoCs for OEMs to implement Zero clients either with the Teradici-developed Tera1 or Tera2 chip, which implement the PCoIP protocol.

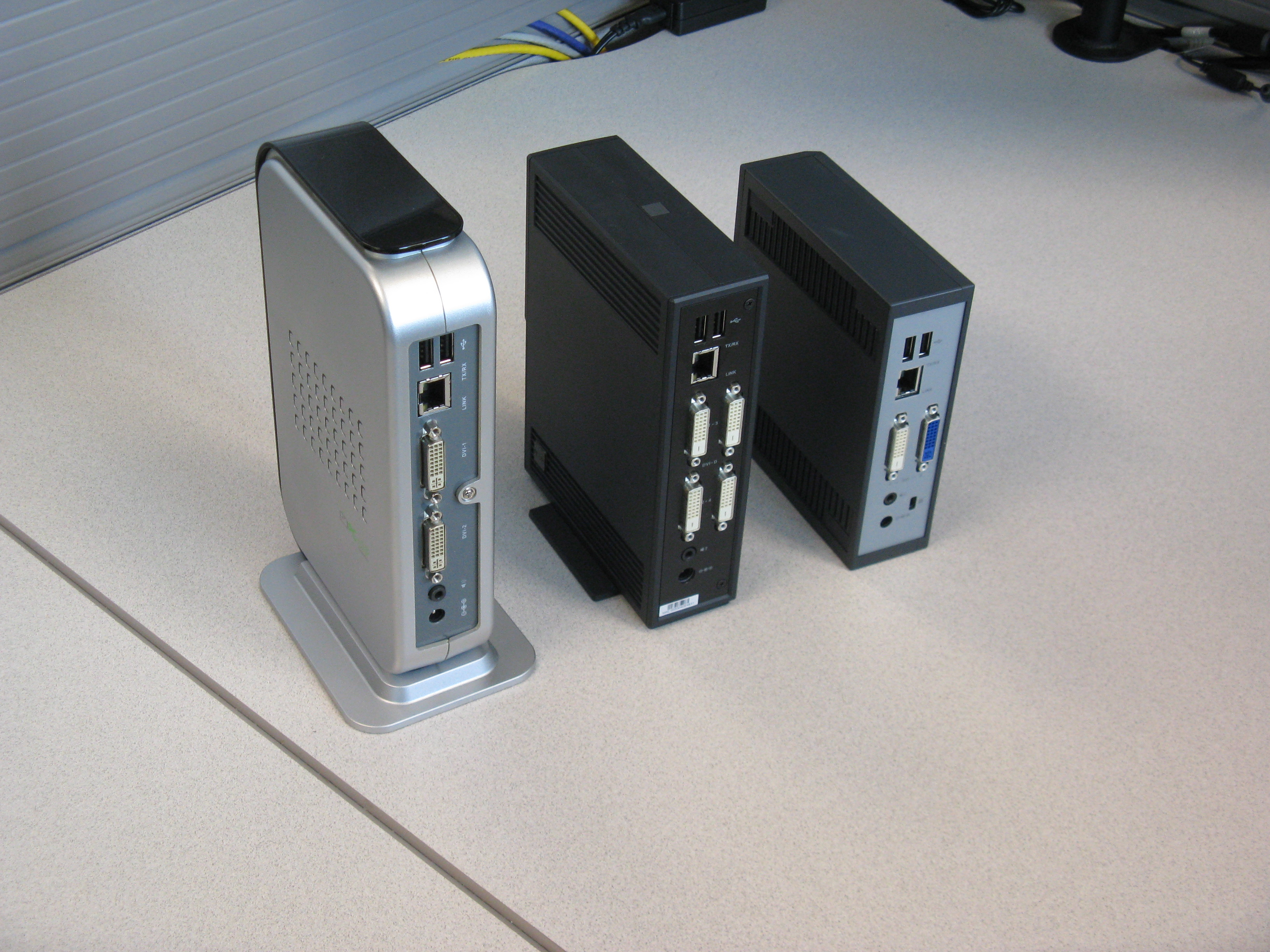
Rear shot Teradici PCoIP zero clients. From left to right Tera1, Tera2 (four DVI ports) and Tera2 (two DVI ports)

- PCoIP Workstation 1:1 host SoC (System on a Chip): An SoC allowing an OEM to implement a PCIe card which plugs into a workstation (typically a blade computer), allowing it to be remoted and controlled by a client device, either a PCoIP Zero Client or PCoIP Software Client. The connection is 1:1, meaning one host system to one remote user; it is not virtualized or shared and can capture the output from a GPU for full HD and 2K remoting along with redirecting audio and USB peripherals.
- PCoIP software clients: Software implementation of the PCoIP protocol for flexible client device support. Select OEMs include this in their products for x86 and ARM-based thin clients. This is also the basis for the VMware and AWS Amazon Workspaces software clients for Windows, Mac, Linux, iOS and Android which use Teradici-developed core PCoIP protocol and decoding technology.

=== Direct products ===
- Teradici APEX 2800 server offload card: A PCIe coprocessor for VMware Horizon, offloading the compression and encryption of graphics and audio to Horizon Software Client or PCoIP Zero Client, improving server consolidation in a VDI environment.
- PCoIP management console: A web-based management tool for administrative control of PCoIP Zero Client devices from a central console.
- Workstation Access Software: Enables remote access via PCoIP Software Client or PCoIP Zero Client to a physical Windows PC or virtual machine in the cloud.
- Host Card.

== See also ==
- Comparison of platform virtualization software
- Desktop virtualization
- x86 virtualization
- Virtual machine
- Virtual appliance
- Thin client
- Comparison of remote desktop software
