= List of yttrium compounds =

This list of yttrium compounds shows compounds of yttrium. Inclusion criteria: those that have applications, academic significance, single crystal structures or have their own Wikipedia articles.

| Name | Molecular formula | Molecular weight (g/mol) | Reference |
|---|---|---|---|
| Yttrium acetate | C_{6}H_{9}O_{6}Y | 266.038 | |
| Yttrium acetylacetonate | Y(C_{5}H_{7}O_{2})_{3} | 388.233 | |
| Yttrium(III) antimonide | YSb | 210.666 | |
| Yttrium arsenate | YAsO_{4} | 227.828 | |
| Yttrium arsenide | YAs | 163.828 | |
| Yttrium boride | YB_{25} | 359.181 | |
| Yttrium boride | YB_{66} | 802.432 | |
| Yttrium bromide | YBr_{3} | 328.62 | |
| Yttrium chloride | YCl_{3} | 195.26 | |
| Yttrium fluoride | YF_{3} | 145.9 | |
| Yttrium formate | Y(HCOO)_{3} | 223.963 | |
| Yttrium nitride | YN | 102.913 | |
| Yttrium nitrate | Y(NO_{3})_{3} | 274.927 | |
| Yttrium oxalate tetrahydrate | C_{6}O_{12}Y_{2} | 441.86 | |
| Yttrium orthovanadate | YVO_{4} | 203.84 | |
| Yttrium(III) oxide | Y_{2}O_{3} | 225.81 | |
| Yttrium(III) perchlorate | Y(ClO_{4})_{3} | 387.265 | |
| Yttrium(III) perchlorate hexahydrate | Y(ClO_{4})_{3}·6H_{2}O | 495.361 | |
| Yttrium phosphide | YP | 119.88 | |
| Yttrium phosphate | YPO_{4} | 183.877 | |
| Yttrium sulfate | O_{12}S_{3}Y_{2} | 465.98 | |
| Yttrium sulfate octahydrate | H_{16}O_{20}S_{3}Y_{2} | 610.1 | |
| Yttrium sulfide | Y_{2}S_{3} | 274.01 | |
