= Network Computer =

Minimum computer by Oracle, 1996–2000

- Developer: Oracle Corporation
- Released: 1996
- Discontinued: 2000

The Network Computer (or NC) was a diskless desktop computer device made by Oracle Corporation from about 1996 to 2000. The devices were designed and manufactured by an alliance, which included Sun Microsystems (acquired by Oracle in 2010), IBM, and others. The devices were designed with minimum specifications, based on the Network Computer Reference Profile. The brand was also employed as a marketing term to try to popularize this design of computer within enterprise and among consumers.

The NC brand was mainly intended to inspire a range of desktop computers from various suppliers that, by virtue of their diskless design and use of inexpensive components and software, were cheaper and easier to manage than standard fat client desktops. However, due to the commoditization of standard desktop components, and due to the increasing availability and popularity of various software options for using full desktops as diskless nodes, thin clients, and hybrid clients, the Network Computer brand never achieved the popularity hoped for by Oracle and was eventually mothballed.

The term network computer is now used for any diskless desktop computer or a thin client.

== History ==
The failure of the NC to impact on the scale predicted by Larry Ellison may have been caused by a number of factors. Firstly, prices of PCs quickly fell below $1000, making the competition very hard. Secondly, the software available for NCs was neither mature nor open.

Thirdly, the idea could simply have been ahead of its time, as at the NC's launch in 1996, the typical home Internet connection was only a 28.8 kbit/s modem dialup. This was simply insufficient for the delivery of executable content. The World Wide Web itself was not considered mainstream until its breakout year, 1998. Prior to this, very few Internet service providers advertised in mainstream press (at least outside of the US), and knowledge of the Internet was limited. This could have held back uptake of what would be seen as a very niche device with no (then) obvious appeal.

NCs ended up being used as the very 'dumb terminals' they were intended to replace, as the proprietary backend infrastructure is not readily available. 1990s era NCs are often network-booted into a minimal Unix with X, to serve as X terminals. While NC purists may consider this to be a suboptimal use of NC hardware, the NCs work well as terminals, and are considerably cheaper than purpose-built terminal hardware.

== NC standards and drafts ==
=== Reference Profile ===
The initial Network Computing standard, the Network Computer Reference Profile (NCRef), required that all 'NC' appliances supported HTML, Java, HTTP, JPEG, and other key standards.

=== Other standards ===
Because many NCs did not use Intel CPUs or Microsoft software, Microsoft and Intel developed a competing standard called NetPC. Other alternatives to the NCRef were WeBRef (Motorola and HDS Network Systems) and Odin (National Semiconductor). The HDS @workStation was stated to ship by the end of June 1996.

== NC implementations ==
=== Acorn Network Computer ===
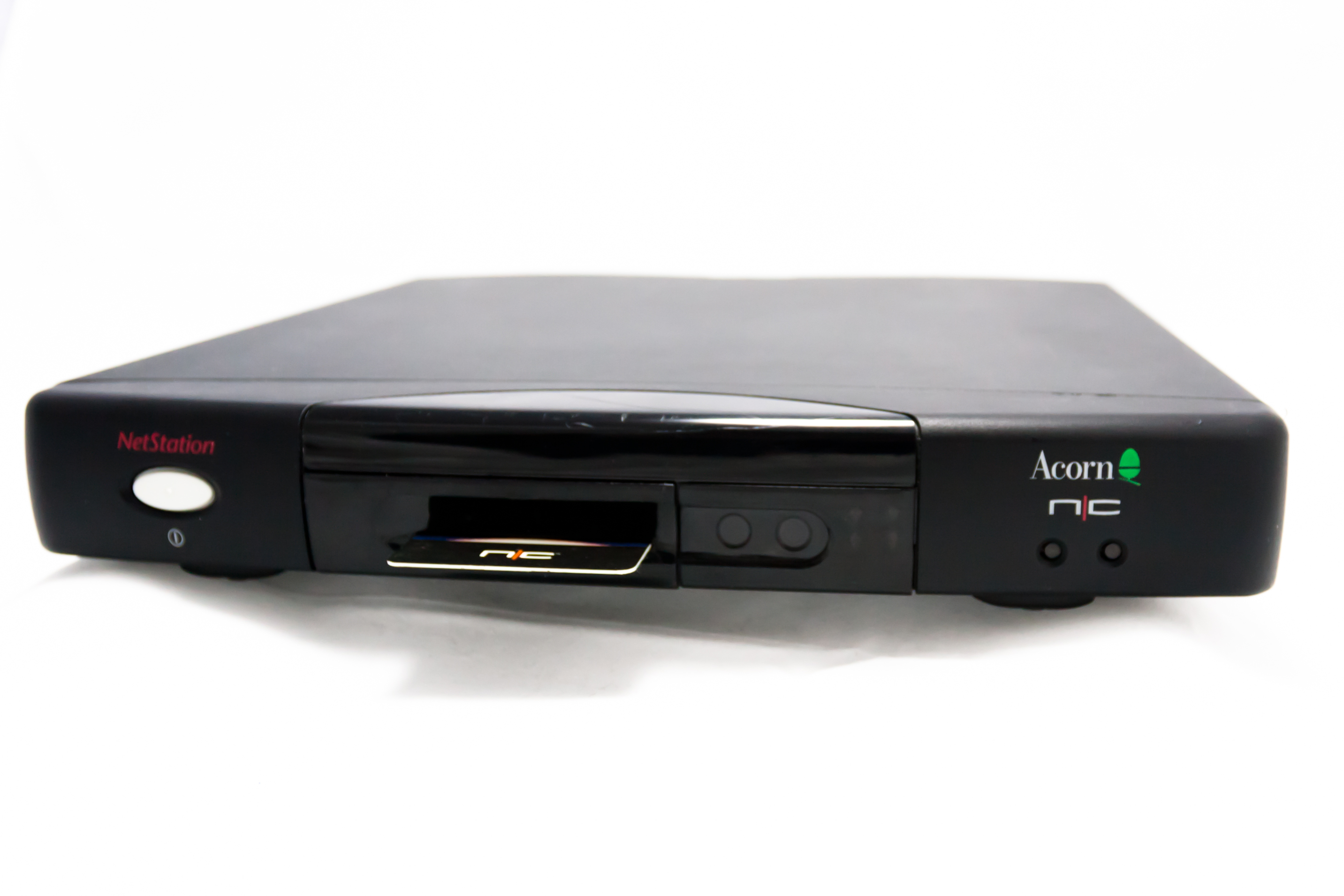
An Acorn NetStation NC

The Acorn Network Computer was Oracle's initial reference implementation of the NC. Its development was subcontracted to British company Acorn Computers, who adapted its own RISC OS to create NCOS. Acorn made use of local partner companies ANT, Icon Technology and Design Edge to fulfil their contract.

=== Macintosh NC ===
In 1997 Apple announced the Mac NC, its attempt to develop the Pippin into a network computer platform. By the end of 1997, Steve Jobs discontinued all Macintosh clone efforts, effectively killing the Pippin, although key components of the Mac NC technology were inherited by the original iMac.

=== NetProducts NetStation ===
The first generation NetStation design and the NetStation trademark was licensed to NChannel, which provided the consumer equipment and Internet service (with associated infrastructure) for the UK market. After a few months, NChannel split into two entities: NetChannel (which provided the Internet service) and NetProducts which provided the consumer hardware.

NetProducts started working with Acorn to develop a next-generation product, NetStation II and started developing an email-only set-top-box (the TVemail). NetProducts went into voluntary liquidation in 1998 before either project was completed.

=== Sun Microsystems JavaStation ===
Sun Microsystems developed the JavaStation, a JavaOS-based NC based on SPARC hardware, initially similar to Sun's range of Unix workstations.

=== IBM Network Station ===
IBM launched its Network Station in September 1996. As with the later reference design, the Network Station used a NetBSD-based NCOS booted over a LAN from an AS/400 or IBM PC server. The Network Station supported local execution of basic applications, such as a web browser and console. In addition, X capability was also implemented to allow both locally and remotely run applications to be used on the same machine. In practice, the lack of real applications meant that this was little more than a hardware X terminal.

The IBM Network Station was originally based on the PowerPC architecture, but the final few models used Intel Pentium processors.

== Contemporary analogy ==
The idea behind the NC can be seen as existing in contemporary times in the system of cloud computing and in particular ChromeOS. In Wired magazine, Daniel Roth claims that the failure of the network computer eventually led to the development of cloud computing. A large contribution to this transition was attributed to Eric Schmidt, once the CTO of Sun Microsystems, a proponent of the network computer, who eventually became the CEO of Google. Google is a large purveyor of cloud technology, "most notably Google Docs and Spreadsheets".

== See also ==
- Diskless node
- Thin client
- Hybrid client
- Information appliance
- nCUBE
- Open Blueprint
- Sun Ray
- I-Opener
