= SCN =

SCN may stand for:

== Science and technology ==
- .scn, SceneKit archive format
- Satellite Catalog Number, an identification number given to satellites
- Scandium nitride (ScN), an inorganic compound
- Scene mode, a mode in digital cameras
- Server change number, a counter variable used in client-server architecture
- Sociocybernetics
- Switched circuit network, i.e. the public switched telephone network
- System change number, a stamp that defines a committed version in an Oracle Database
- Thiocyanate, an organic compound in the cyanate family

== Medicine ==
- SCN1A to SCN11A, and SCN2B to SCN4B, sodium channel genes and beta subunits
- Severe congenital neutropenia, rare disorders
- Solid cell nests, in pathology
- Soybean cyst nematode, a type of parasitic nematode
- Suprachiasmatic nucleus, in the brain's hypothalamus

== Communications & media ==
- SCN (TV station), a TV station in Broken Hill, New South Wales, Australia
- Saskatchewan Communications Network, a TV channel
- Southern Command Network, a defunct American Armed Forces radio and television broadcaster in the Panama Canal Zone
- SAP Community Network, of SAP SE users
- SCN, former branding of GLV/BCV, a TV station in Victoria, Australia
- SCN Sportcanal, a defunct Portuguese television channel

== Organizations ==
- Secure Community Network, a US-based Jewish security advisory organization
- Sisters of Charity of Nazareth, a Catholic religious order
- Supervisory Council of the North, an Afghan military unit
- Supreme Court of Nigeria

== Other uses ==
- Saarbrücken Airport (IATA: SCN), in Saarland, Germany
- Saint Kitts and Nevis, ITU country code
- Sapotaweyak Cree Nation, Manitoba, Canada
- Satellite Control Network, a satellite communications and control network operated by the United States Space Force. Formerly known as the Air Force Satellite Control Network.
- Scottish Candidate Number, a student identifier
- Sicilian language (ISO 639: scn)
