= Gadolinium acetylacetonate =

Names
- IUPAC name Tris(acetylacetonato)gadolinium(III)
- Systematic IUPAC name Tris[(Z)-4-oxopent-2-en-2-olato-κ^{2}O,O′]gadolinium(III)

Identifiers
CAS Number	14284-87-8 anhydrous; 47313-82-6 dihydrate
3D model (JSmol)	Interactive image
ChemSpider	103881377
ECHA InfoCard	100.034.699
EC Number	238-186-2
PubChem CID	84317
UNII	WSR7UR34P3
- InChI: InChI=1S/3C5H7O2.Gd/c3*1-4(6)3-5(2)7;/h3*3H,1-2H3;/q3*-1;+3 Key: PJCXQIZIMGZZIT-UHFFFAOYSA-N
- SMILES: CC(=O)[CH-]C(=O)C.CC(=O)[CH-]C(=O)C.CC(=O)[CH-]C(=O)C.[Gd+3]

Properties
Chemical formula	C_{15}H_{21}GdO_{6}
Molar mass	454.58 g·mol^{−1}
Appearance	Off-white

Hazards
- GHS labelling
Pictograms	(GHS07: Exclamation mark)
Signal word	Warning
Hazard statements	H315, H319, H335
Precautionary statements	P261, P264, P264+P265, P271, P280, P302+P352, P304+P340, P305+P351+P338, P319, P321, P332+P317, P337+P317, P362+P364, P403+P233, P405, P501
- Except where otherwise noted, data are given for materials in their standard state (at 25 °C [77 °F], 100 kPa). Infobox references

Gadolinium acetylacetonate is a coordination compound with the formula Gd(C_{5}H_{7}O_{2})_{3}. This anhydrous acetylacetonate complex is widely discussed but unlikely to exist per se. The 8-coordinated dihydrate Gd(C_{5}H_{7}O_{2})_{3}(H_{2}O)_{2} is a more plausible formula based on the behavior of other lanthanide complexes. It has also been characterized twice by X-ray crystallography.

Upon heating under vacuum, the dihydrate converts to the oxo-cluster Gd_{4}O(C_{5}H_{7}O_{2})_{10}. This behavior is also observed for europium acetylacetonate, yttrium acetylacetonate, lanthanum acetylacetonate, and erbium acetylacetonate.

== Uses ==
Gadolinium acetylacetonate, along with cerium acetylacetonate, can be used as precursors to synthesize gadolinia-doped ceria (GDC) gel powders using the sol-gel method.
