= Acorn Network Computer =

Computer model launched in 1996

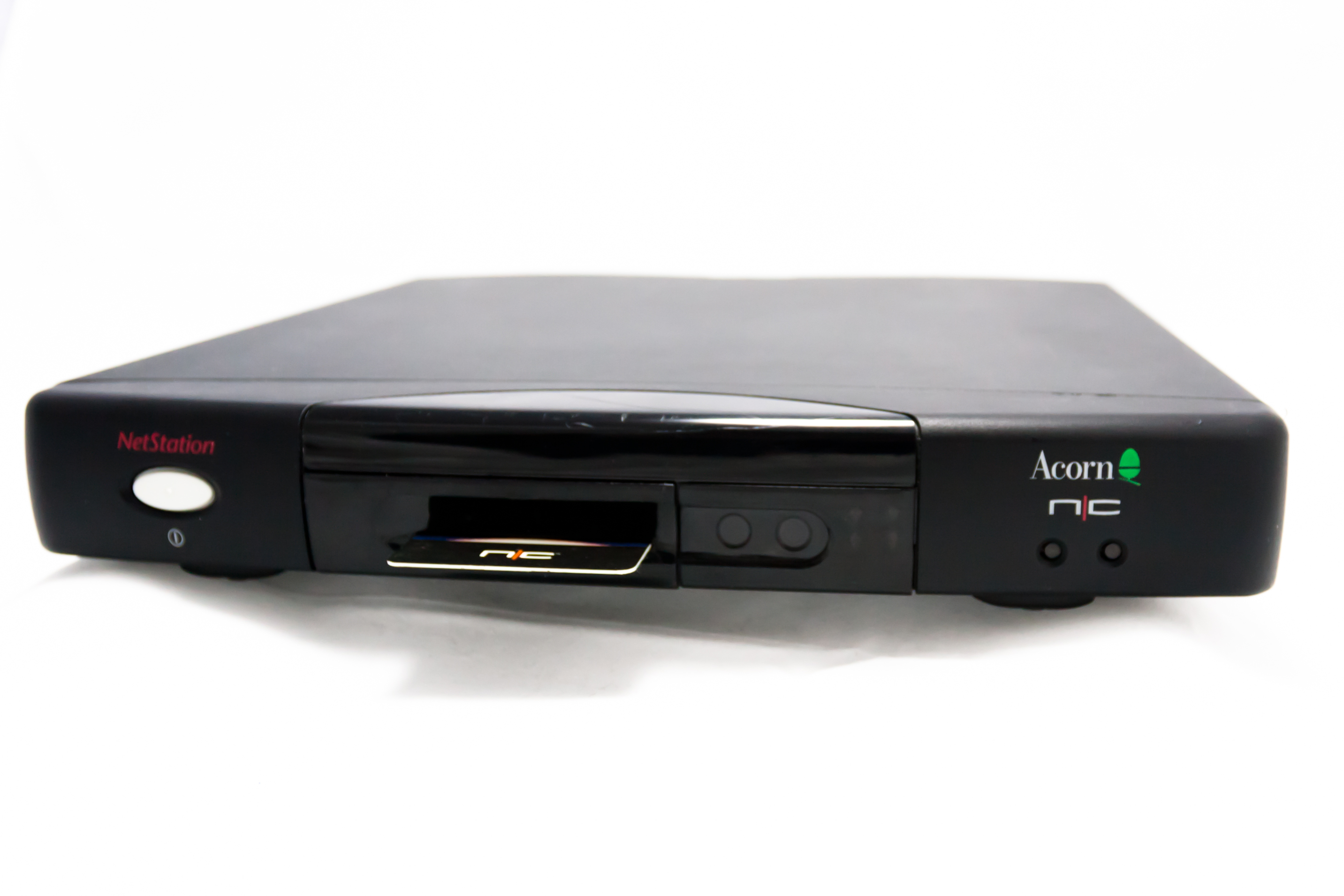
- Acorn NetStation NC
- Developer: Acorn Computers, Oracle
- Manufacturer: Acorn Computers
- Released: August 1996; 30 years ago
- Discontinued: 2006
- Operating system: NCOS (on 4096 KB ROM)
- CPU: ARM 7500FE processor at 40 MHz; approx 35.9 MIPS
- Memory: 4096 KB 12 MHz RAM
- Predecessor: Acorn Computer Group
- Related: Acornsoft
- Website: "Network Computers" at acorn.com at the Wayback Machine (archived 1999-02-03)

The Acorn Network Computer was a network computer (a type of thin client) designed and manufactured by Acorn Computers Ltd. It was the implementation of the Network Computer Reference Profile that Oracle Corporation commissioned Acorn to specify for network computers (for more detail on the history, see Acorn's Network Computer). Sophie Wilson of Acorn led the effort. It was launched in August 1996.

The NCOS operating system used in this first implementation was based on RISC OS and ran on ARM hardware. Manufacturing obligations were achieved through a contract with Fujitsu subsidiary D2D.

In 1997, Acorn offered its designs at no cost to licensees of RISC OS.

== Hardware models ==
=== Original model ===
The NetStation was available in two versions, one with a modem for home use via a television, and a version with an Ethernet card for use in businesses and schools with VGA monitors and an on-site BSD Unix fileserver based on RiscBSD, an early ARM port of NetBSD. Both versions were upgradable, as the modem and Ethernet cards were replaceable "podules" (Acorn-format Eurocards). The home version was trialled in 1997/98 in conjunction with BT.

The Home NC and Corporate NC both used the ARM 7500FE and supported PAL, NTSC and SVGA displays. They had identical specifications. The Office NC used a StrongARM SA-110 200 MHz processor. The ARM7500-based DeskLite was launched in 1998.

=== StrongARM ===
Acorn continued to produce ARM-based designs, demonstrating its first StrongARM prototype in May 1996, and the Office NC 6 months later. This evolved into the CoNCord, launched in late 1997.

=== New markets ===
Further designs included the Set-top Box NC (STB NC), the ExecPhone NC, and the NC TV.

=== Later versions ===
The second generation Network Computer operating system was no longer based on RISC OS. NC Desktop, from Oracle subsidiary Network Computer Inc., instead combined NetBSD and the X Window System, featuring desktop windows whose contents were typically described using HTML, reminiscent of (but not entirely equivalent to) the use of Display PostScript in NeXTStep. The product ran on ARM, StrongARM and x86 architectures and could be run on traditional personal computers. NC Desktop was the recommended software solution for products based on the StrongARM-based Digital Network Appliance Reference Design (DNARD). Later NCs were produced based on the Intel Pentium architecture such as products from Accton Technology Corporation and UMAX Data Systems.

== Usage ==
The NetStation was planned to ship with a smart card to enable internet banking.

== See also ==
- Mac NC
