= Ytterbium(III) acetylacetonate =

Names
- IUPAC name Tris(acetylacetonato)ytterbium(III)
- Systematic IUPAC name Tris[(Z)-4-oxopent-2-en-2-olato-κ^{2}O,O′]ytterbium(III)
- Other names ytterbium(III) acetylacetonate

Identifiers
CAS Number	14284-98-1
3D model (JSmol)	Interactive image
ChemSpider	48064012
PubChem CID	44135749
CompTox Dashboard (EPA)	DTXSID80931661
- InChI: InChI=1S/3C5H8O2.Yb/c3*1-4(6)3-5(2)7;/h3*3,6H,1-2H3;/q;;;+3/p-3 Key: CVEKUGFVEWLJFN-UHFFFAOYSA-K
- SMILES: CC(=CC(=O)C)[O-].CC(=CC(=O)C)[O-].CC(=CC(=O)C)[O-].[Yb+3]

Properties
Chemical formula	C_{15}H_{21}O_{6}Yb
Molar mass	470.372 g·mol^{−1}
- Except where otherwise noted, data are given for materials in their standard state (at 25 °C [77 °F], 100 kPa). Infobox references

Ytterbium(III) acetylacetonate is a coordination compound with the chemical formula Yb(C_{5}H_{7}O_{2})_{3}(H_{2}O)_{2}. Its structure is different from the acetylacetone complexes of neodymium, europium and holmium. The adjacent Yb-Yb The distance is 8.3 Å. Yb(acac)_{3}(bpy) can be obtained by reacting its trihydrate with 2,2'-bipyridine in ethanol.
