= Client–queue–client =

Type of client–server computer network

A client–queue–client or passive queue system is a client–server computer network in which the server is a data queue for the clients. Instead of communicating with each other directly, clients exchange data with one another by storing it in a repository (the queue) on a server.

Like peer-to-peer, the client–queue–client system empowers hosts on the network to serve data to other hosts.

== Example ==
Web crawlers on different hosts need to query each other to synchronize an indexed URI. Whereas one approach is to program each crawler to receive and respond to such queries, the client–queue–client approach is to store the indexed content from both crawlers in a passive queue, such as a relational database, on another host. Both web crawlers read and write to the database, but never communicate with each other.

== See also ==
- Centralized computing
- Decentralized computing
- Friend-to-friend
- Ontology (information science)
