= Europium acetylacetonate =

Names
- IUPAC name Tris(acetylacetonato)europium(III)
- Systematic IUPAC name Tris[(Z)-4-oxopent-2-en-2-olato-κ^{2}O,O′]europium(III)

Identifiers
CAS Number	14284-86-7 anhydrous; 52081-76-2 dihydrate
3D model (JSmol)	Interactive image
ChemSpider	76060
ECHA InfoCard	100.034.698
EC Number	238-185-7
PubChem CID	14455607
UNII	X5US2R5ZCX
- InChI: InChI=1S/3C5H7O2.Eu/c3*1-4(6)3-5(2)7;/h3*3H,1-2H3;/q3*-1;+3 Key: YMTKZYSHNNXTIJ-UHFFFAOYSA-N
- SMILES: CC(=CC(=O)C)[O-].CC(=CC(=O)C)[O-].CC(=CC(=O)C)[O-].[Eu+3]

Properties
Chemical formula	C_{15}H_{21}EuO_{6}
Molar mass	449.291 g·mol^{−1}
Melting point	187 to 189 °C (369 to 372 °F; 460 to 462 K) (decomposes)
- Except where otherwise noted, data are given for materials in their standard state (at 25 °C [77 °F], 100 kPa). Infobox references

Europium acetylacetonate is a coordination complex with formula Eu(C_{5}H_{7}O_{2})_{3}. Although this anhydrous acetylacetonate complex is widely discussed, some sources suggest that it is really the dihydrate Eu(C_{5}H_{7}O_{2})_{3}(H_{2}O)_{2}.

Upon attempted dehydration by heating under vacuum, the dihydrate converts to the oxo-cluster Eu_{4}O(C_{5}H_{7}O_{2})_{10}. This behavior is also observed for gadolinium acetylacetonate, yttrium acetylacetonate, lanthanum acetylacetonate, and erbium acetylacetonate.

The electronic structure of the Eu^{3+} core gives the complex an unusual charge-transfer band absent in other lanthanide acetylacetonates. The photoluminescent emission lines occur near 465 (blue), 525 (green), and 579 nm (yellow), and are unusually sharp, especially the yellow doublet. Doping a blend of polyacrylate and polycarbonate with europium acetylacetonate enhances photoluminescence over a broad range of ultraviolet wavelengths. EuFOD is a substituted derivative.
