= NCRP =

NCRP may refer to one of the following:

- National Council on Radiation Protection and Measurements, USA
- Network Computer Reference Profile
- National Committee for Responsive Philanthropy
