= JGM =

JGM can refer to:

- J.G.M. A.S.C. Huambo, a sports club from Angola
- Jana Gana Mana (2023 film), an unfinished Indian military action film in Telugu
- Jhargram railway station, a train station in Jhargram, West Bengal, India
- Chief of the Cabinet of Ministers (Spanish: Jefe de Gabinete de Ministros de la Nación Argentina), a ministerial office in Argentina

== See also ==
- J. G. M. Thewissen (born 1959), a Dutch-American paleontologist studying whale evolution
- J. G. M. Ramsey (1797 – 1884), an American historian, doctor, slave owner, and businessman
- Jive Gamification Module, a gamification mechanic in the SAP Community Network user community
