= LISCON =

Software company in Austria

LISCON Information Technology, GmbH
- Company type: GmbH
- Industry: Computer Systems
- Founded: 2000
- Headquarters: Klagenfurt, Austria
- Products: Thin clients
- Website: liscon.com

LISCON is a software company creating management software for Thin Clients and a Linux-based operating system for their Thin Clients and those of other manufacturers, as well as PCs. The company was founded in 2000 and filed for bankruptcy in May 2010. The company was closed down in August 2010.

== LISCON Management Console ==
Differently to the quite common use of cloning the settings of a thin client via network or a USB memory key, the central management console allows different settings for each client with the LISCON OS or LISCON's XPe and reapplies them if the Thin Client or its hardware is changed. The settings include hardware settings like screen resolutions as well as properties for connections like RDP, Citrix ICA or VMware View. Firmware updates are possible as well as VNC to the client. It is possible to define certain groups and hand down all or specific settings to sub groups in the client's hierarchy, therefore supporting large networks of Thin Clients. The Management Console itself is a web application and with an optimized iPhone version.

== Founding and awards ==
LISCON Informationstechnologie GmbH was founded in 2000 in Klagenfurt, Austria. In 2002, LISCON received the innovation and research award of Carinthia, Austria.

== Competitors ==
Competitors in the market place include: Wyse, Igel and Neoware beside others. Partners are VXL, HP and Fujitsu.
