= NetPC =

NetPC is a standard for diskless PCs, developed by Microsoft and Intel as a competing standard to the Network Computer standard, because many NCs did not use Intel CPUs or Microsoft software. Network Computer was launched by Oracle Corporation in the mid-1990s.
