= Yttrium acetylacetonate =

Names
- IUPAC name Tris(acetylacetonato)yttrium(III)
- Systematic IUPAC name Tris[(Z)-4-oxopent-2-en-2-olato-κ^{2}O,O′]yttrium(III)

Identifiers
CAS Number	15554-47-9
3D model (JSmol)	Interactive image
ECHA InfoCard	100.035.991
EC Number	239-607-2
- InChI: InChI=1S/3C5H7O2.Y/c3*1-4(6)3-5(2)7;/h3*3H,1-2H3;/q3*-1;-3/p+6 Key: FUGHTIFGMPMKBQ-UHFFFAOYSA-T
- SMILES: CC1=O[Y+3]23(O=C(C)[CH-]C(C)=O2)(O=C(C)[CH-]C(C)=O3)O=C(C)[CH-]1

Properties
Chemical formula	C_{15}H_{27}O_{9}Y
Molar mass	440.278 g·mol^{−1}
Melting point	131 °C (404 K)
- Except where otherwise noted, data are given for materials in their standard state (at 25 °C [77 °F], 100 kPa). Infobox references

Yttrium acetylacetonate is a coordination compound with the chemical formula Y(C_{5}H_{7}O_{2})_{3}(H_{2}O)_{x}, or Y(acac)_{3}(H_{2}O)_{x} for short. The value of x can vary from 1 to 3.

Upon heating under vacuum, the hydrates convert to the oxo-cluster Y_{4}O(C_{5}H_{7}O_{2})_{10}. This behavior is also observed for gadolinium acetylacetonate, europium acetylacetonate, lanthanum acetylacetonate, and erbium acetylacetonate.
