= Yttrium nitride =

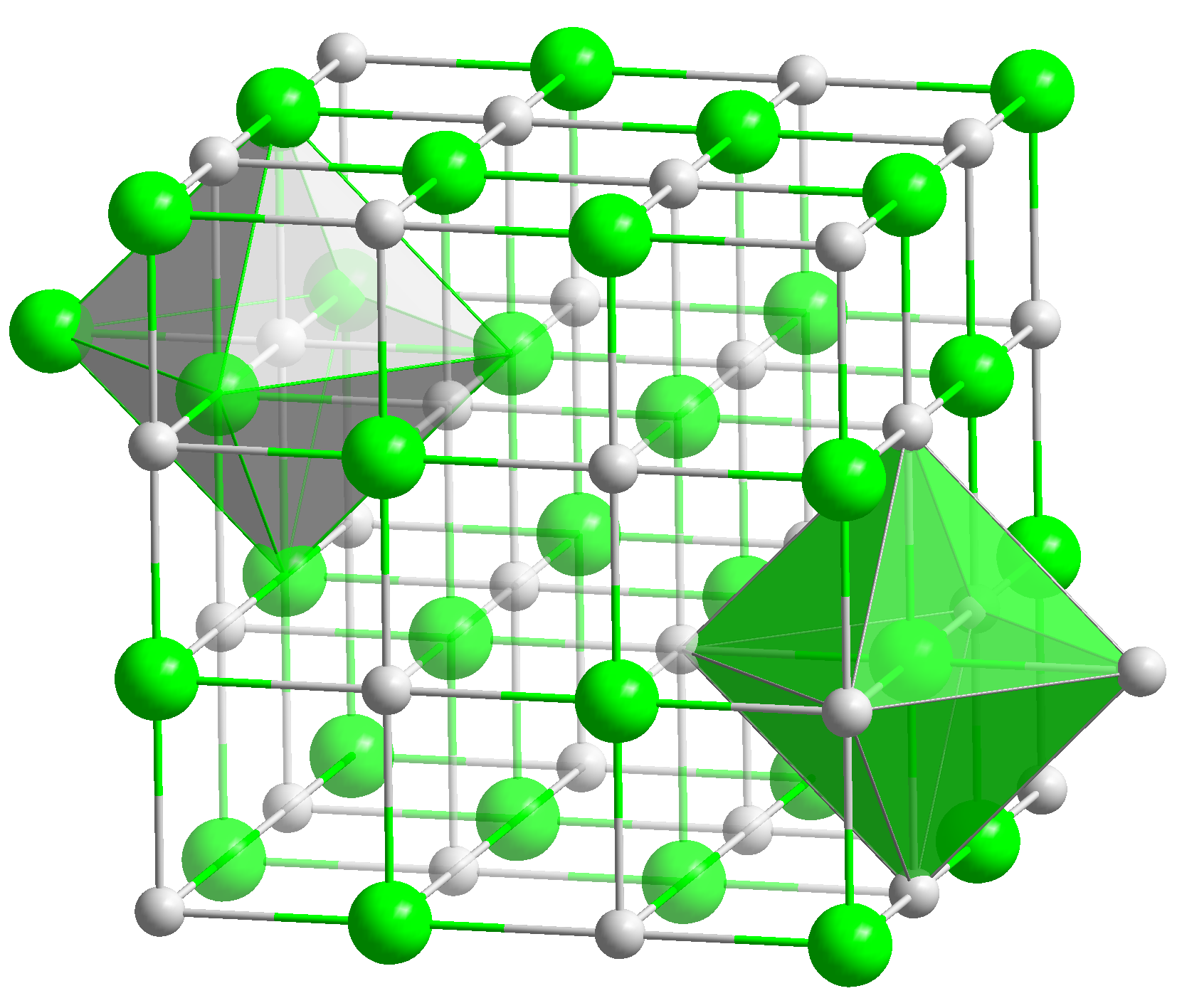
- Yttrium nitride

Identifiers
CAS Number	25764-13-0
3D model (JSmol)	Interactive image
ECHA InfoCard	100.042.939
EC Number	247-248-8
PubChem CID	117630
CompTox Dashboard (EPA)	DTXSID4067143
- InChI: InChI=1S/N.Y Key: AJXBBNUQVRZRCZ-UHFFFAOYSA-N
- SMILES: [Y+3].[N-3]

Properties
Chemical formula	YN
Molar mass	102.913 g/mol
Appearance	black crystalline
Density	5.60 g/cm^{3}
Melting point	~3033K (2760°C; 5000°F)
Solubility in water	decomposing

Structure
Crystal structure	cubic, cF8
Space group	Fm3̅m, No. 225

Hazards
- GHS labelling
Pictograms	(GHS02: Flammable) (GHS05: Corrosive)
Signal word	Danger
Hazard statements	H228, H314
Precautionary statements	P210, P240, P241, P260, P264, P280, P301+P330+P331, P303+P361+P353, P304+P340, P305+P351+P338, P310, P321, P363, P370+P378, P405, P501
Safety data sheet (SDS)	External MSDS

Related compounds
Other anions	Yttrium phosphide Yttrium(III) arsenide Yttrium(III) antimonide
Other cations	Scandium nitride Lutetium nitride
- Except where otherwise noted, data are given for materials in their standard state (at 25 °C [77 °F], 100 kPa). verify (what is ?) Infobox references

Yttrium nitride, YN, is a nitride of yttrium.

Yttrium nitride is hard ceramic material similar to titanium nitride and zirconium nitride. Under ambient conditions, rock salt phase of YN stablizes and its lattice constant is 4.88 Å.

Yttrium nitride shows similar semiconducting properties as the nitrides of lanthanum, scandium. In its rock salt structure, YN exhibits an indirect bandgap in the range of 0.9-1.3 eV.

Additionally the lattice structure of YN differs only by 8% from that of gallium nitride. This makes YN a possible buffer layer between a substrate and the GaN layer during GaN crystal growth.
