= Diskless Remote Boot in Linux =

DRBL

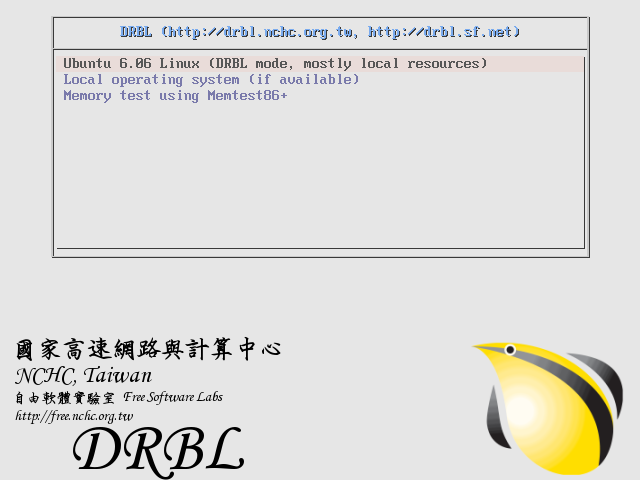
- Graphical boot menu of DRBL.
- Developer: NCHC Free Software Labs
- Initial release: April 1, 2004
- Stable release: 2.2.11 / May 31, 2016
- Operating system: Linux
- Type: Disk cloning, Disaster recovery, Network boot, PXE boot
- License: GNU General Public License
- Website: drbl.sourceforge.net
- Repository: gitlab.com/stevenshiau/drbl

DRBL (Diskless Remote Boot in Linux) is a NFS-/NIS server providing a diskless or systemless environment for client machines. It was developed at Taiwan's National Center for High-Performance Computing beginning in 2003.

It can be used for:

- cloning machines with Clonezilla software inbuilt,
- providing for a network installation of Linux distributions like Fedora, Debian, etc.,
- providing machines via PXE boot (or similar means) with a small size operation system (e.g., DSL, Puppy Linux, FreeDOS).

Providing a DRBL-Server:

- Installation on a machine running a supported Linux distribution via installation script,
- Live CD.

Installation is possible on a machine with Debian, Ubuntu, Mandriva, Red Hat Linux, Fedora, CentOS or SuSE already installed. like LTSP, it uses distributed hardware resources and makes it possible for clients to fully access local hardware, thus making it feasible to use server machines with less power. DRBL also includes Clonezilla, a partitioning and disk cloning utility similar to Symantec Ghost.

DRBL comes under the terms of the GNU GPL license so providing the user with the ability to customize it.

== Features ==
DRBL excels in two main categories.

Disk Cloning

Clonezilla (packaged with DRBL) uses Partimage to avoid copying free space, and gzip to compress Hard Disk images. The stored image can then be restored to multiple machines simultaneously using multicast packets, thus greatly reducing the time it takes to image large numbers of computers. The DRBL Live CD allows you to do all of this without actually installing anything on any of the machines, by simply booting one machine (the server) from the CD, and PXE booting the rest of the machines.

Diskless node

A diskless node is a way to make use of old hardware. Using old hardware as thin clients is a solution, but has some disadvantages that a diskless node can make up for.

- Streaming audio/video - A terminal server must decompress, recompress, and send video over the network to the client. A diskless node does all decompression locally, and can make use of any graphics hardware capabilities on the local machine.
- Software that requires real-time input - Since all input at a thin client is sent over the network before it is registered by the operating system, there can be substantial delay. This is a major problem in software that requires real-time input (i.e. video games). Diskless nodes run the software locally, and as such, do not have this problem.

DRBL allows one to set up multiple diskless nodes with relative ease.

== Inner workings ==
The client computer is set to boot from the network card using PXE or Etherboot. The client requests an IP address, and tftp image to boot from, both are provided by the DRBL server. The client boots the initial RAM disk provided by the DRBL server via tftp, and proceeds to mount an nfs share (also provided by the DRBL server) as its root (/) partition. From there, the client boots either the linux distribution on which the DRBL server is installed, Clonezilla, or an installer for various Linux distributions, depending on how that particular client was configured on the DRBL server.

All system resources reside on the local machine except storage, which resides on the DRBL server.

== System recommendations ==
The main bottleneck in a DRBL installation is between the storage on the DRBL server, and the client workstation. Fast storage on the server (RAID), and a fast network (Gigabit Ethernet), are ideal in this type of environment.

== External resources ==
- DRBL
- Clonezilla
