= Carry-I =

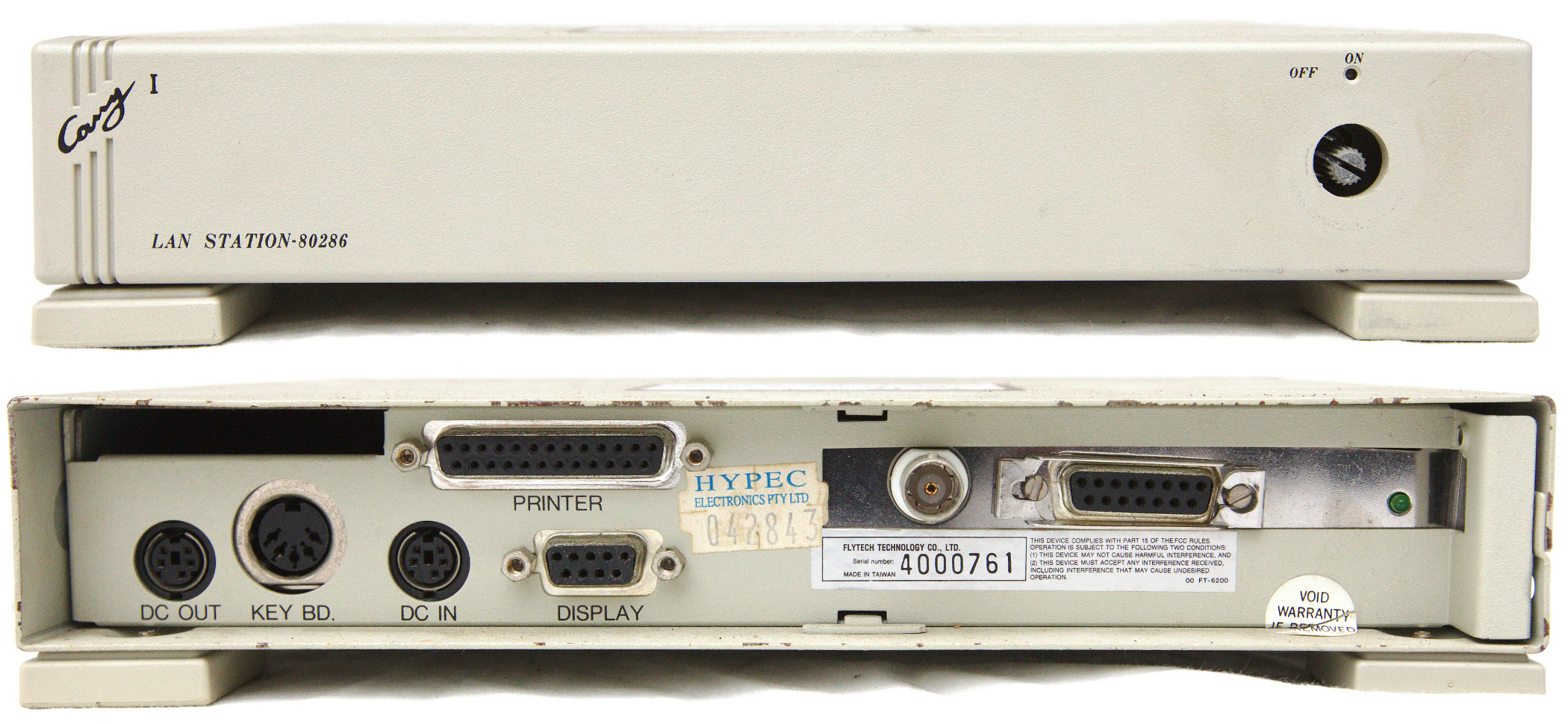
Front and rear views of the Carry-I book-size LAN station diskless workstation, based on an Intel 80286 processor.

The Carry-I was a book-size workstation produced by Flytech Technology of Taiwan, circa 1991. It was available in multiple configurations; ranging from Intel 8088 based XT-compatible models, to a high end model powered by a 16 MHz 386SX and featuring an 80MB hard drive. It was also available as a diskless node powered by either an 8088 or an 80286. The system was bundled with DR DOS 5.0.

In Australia the system was sold by the company Hypec Technology Pty. Ltd.

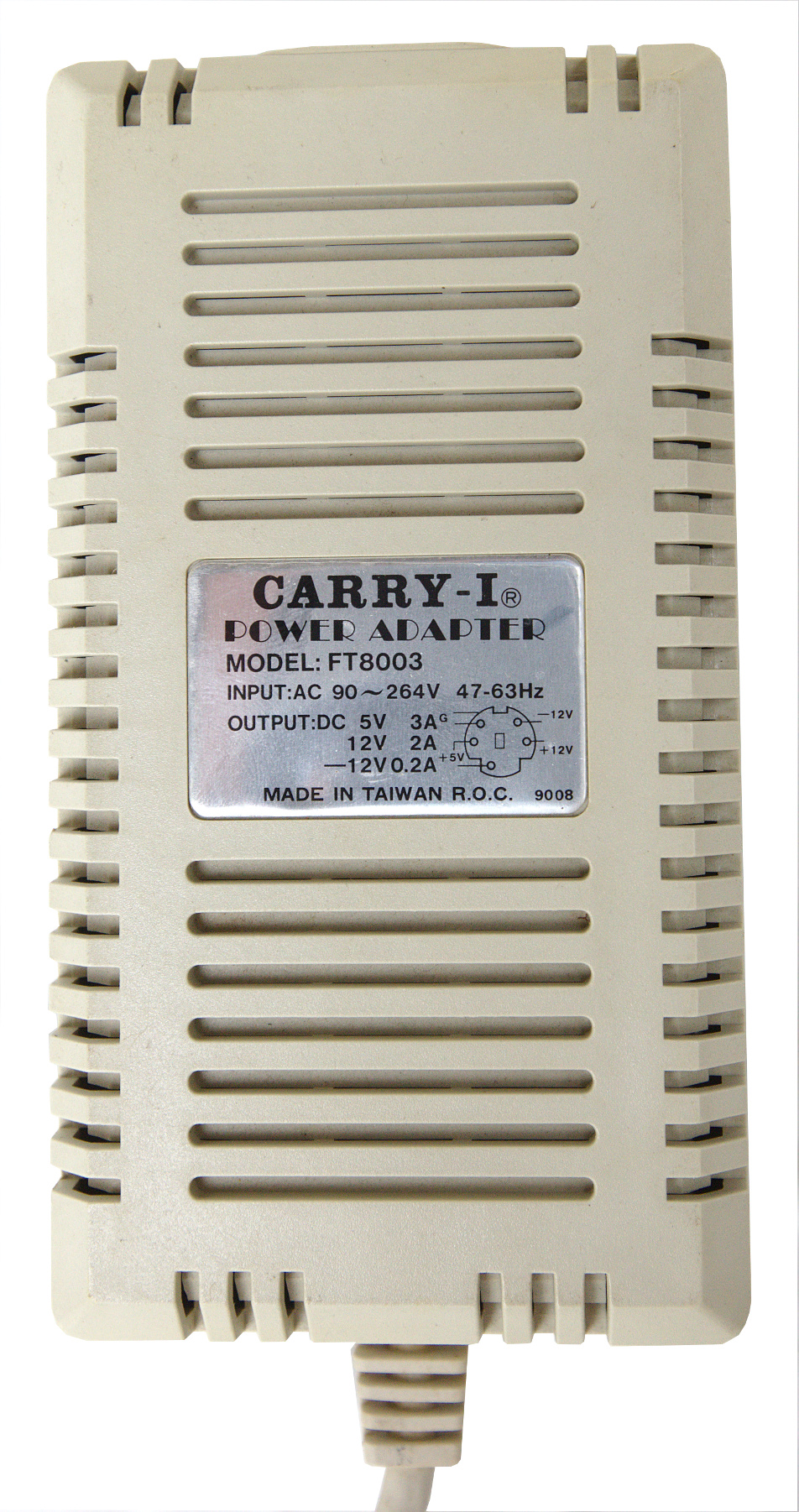
Power supply unit for the Carry-I. Note the detailed pinout diagram for the power connector.
