= Cerium(III) acetylacetonate =

Names
- IUPAC name Tris(acetylacetonato)cerium(III)
- Systematic IUPAC name Tris[(Z)-4-oxopent-2-en-2-olato-κ^{2}O,O′]cerium(III)

Identifiers
CAS Number	15653-01-7
3D model (JSmol)	Interactive image
ChemSpider	4952846
ECHA InfoCard	100.036.094
EC Number	239-720-7
PubChem CID	6450231
- InChI: InChI=1S/3C5H8O2.Ce/c3*1-4(6)3-5(2)7;/h3*3,6H,1-2H3;/q;;;+3/p-3/b3*4-3-; Key: PYPNFSVOZBISQN-LNTINUHCSA-K; InChI=1/3C5H8O2.Ce/c3*1-4(6)3-5(2)7;/h3*3,6H,1-2H3;/q;;;+3/p-3/b3*4-3-; Key: PYPNFSVOZBISQN-QQVDQASFBR
- SMILES: [Ce+3].O=C(/C=C(\[O-])C)C.[O-]\C(=C/C(=O)C)C.[O-]\C(=C/C(=O)C)C

Properties
Chemical formula	C_{15}H_{21}CeO_{6}
Molar mass	437.443 g·mol^{−1}
Appearance	Crystalline powder

Hazards
- GHS labelling
Pictograms	(GHS07: Exclamation mark)
Signal word	Warning
- Except where otherwise noted, data are given for materials in their standard state (at 25 °C [77 °F], 100 kPa). Infobox references

Cerium(III) acetylacetonate is a compound with formula Ce(C_{5}H_{7}O_{2})_{3}(H_{2}O)_{x}. It is typically isolated as the trihydrate. Partial dehydration gives the dihydrate, a red-brown solid.

== Reactions ==
Cerium acetylacetonate is a precursor to mesoporous nanocrystalline ceria using the sol-gel process. It can also be used along with gadolinium acetylacetonate to synthesize gadolinia-doped ceria (GDC) gel powders.

== See also ==
- Cerium(IV) tetrakis(acetylacetonate)
