= Scandium phosphide =

Names
- Other names Scandium monophosphide, phosphanylidynescandium

Identifiers
CAS Number	12202-43-6
3D model (JSmol)	Interactive image
ChemSpider	74860
ECHA InfoCard	100.032.153
EC Number	235-381-4
PubChem CID	82969
- InChI: InChI=1S/P.Sc Key: QWQKEJRTWGEIBF-UHFFFAOYSA-N
- SMILES: [Sc+3].[P-3]

Properties
Chemical formula	ScP
Molar mass	75.929670 g·mol^{−1}

Structure
Crystal structure	Rock salt structure
Space group	Fm3̅m
Lattice constant	a = 0.5312 nm
Formula units (Z)	4
Coordination geometry	Octahedral at Sc^{3+}, Octahedral at P^{3-}

Related compounds
Other anions	Scandium nitride; Scandium arsenide; Scandium antimonide
Other cations	Cerium phosphide; Yttrium phosphide; Lutetium phosphide
- Except where otherwise noted, data are given for materials in their standard state (at 25 °C [77 °F], 100 kPa). Infobox references

Scandium phosphide is an inorganic compound of scandium and phosphorus with the chemical formula ScP.

== Synthesis ==
ScP can be obtained by the reaction of scandium and phosphorus at 1000 °C.

4 Sc + P_{4} → 4 ScP

== Physical properties ==
This compound is calculated to be a semiconductor used in high power, high frequency applications and in laser diodes.

== Chemical properties ==
ScP can be smelted with cobalt or nickel through electric arc to obtain ScCoP and ScNiP.
