= DeskLite =

The DeskLite was a thin client launched in 1998 by Acorn Computers. It was designed to provide access to Microsoft Windows applications via Citrix ICA. It has been described as probably being the last product made by Acorn.

The design is a specialised Network Computer and was promoted to potential licensees for adoption. It was launched at the 1998 Thinergy conference in Orlando.

== Specifications ==
The DeskLite uses Cirrus Logic's CL-PS7500FE (a variant of the ARM7500 with a floating-point coprocessor) and runs RISC OS.
