= Yttrium(III) antimonide =

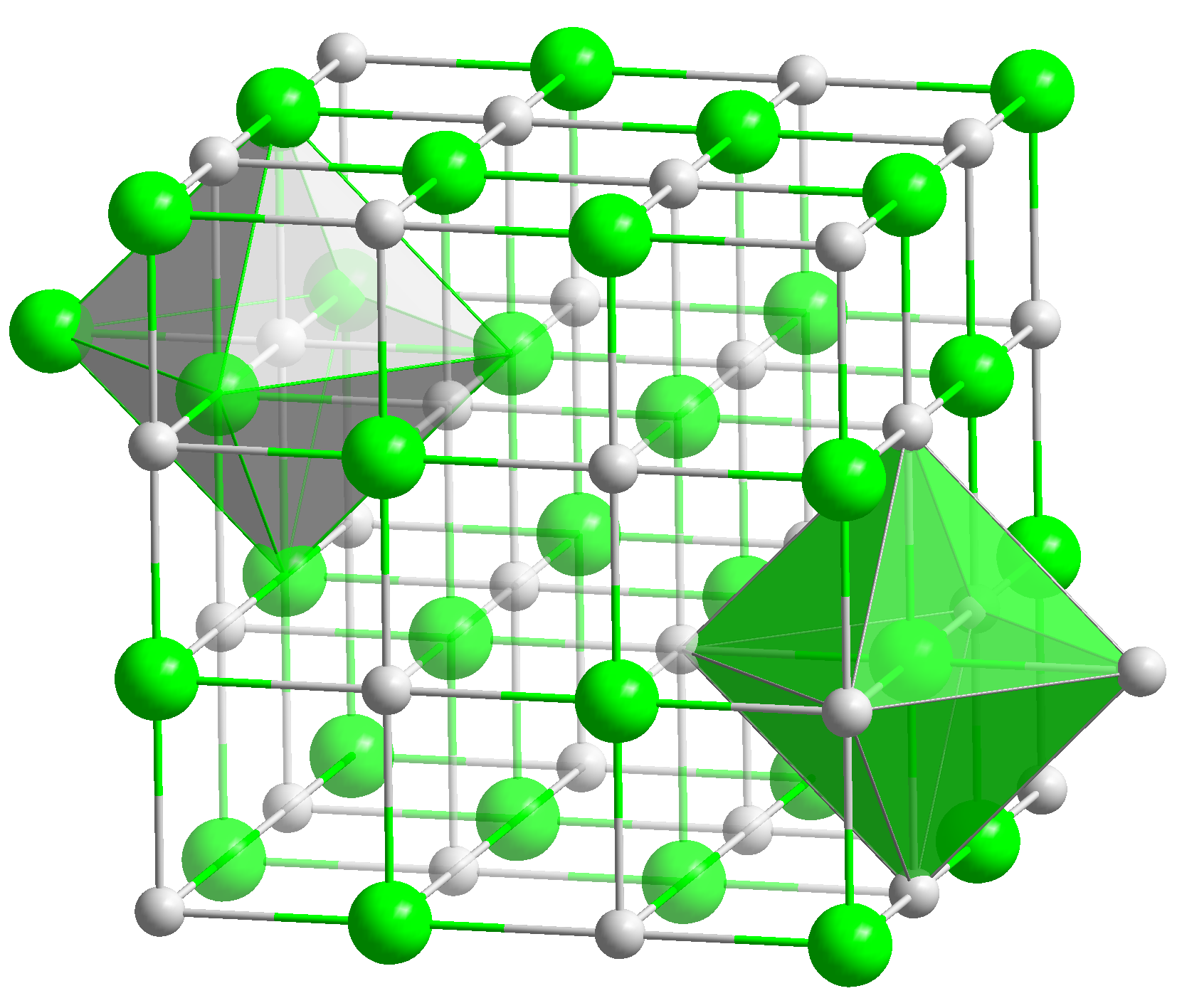

Names
- IUPAC name Yttrium(III) antimonide
- Other names yttrium antimonide

Identifiers
CAS Number	12186-97-9
3D model (JSmol)	Interactive image
ChemSpider	20137723
ECHA InfoCard	100.032.129
EC Number	235-355-2
PubChem CID	6335283
CompTox Dashboard (EPA)	DTXSID70883504
- InChI: InChI=1S/Sb.Y Key: LDAAFTDRWLUENA-UHFFFAOYSA-N
- SMILES: [Y].[Sb]

Properties
Chemical formula	YSb
Molar mass	210.666 g/mol
Appearance	cubic crystals
Density	5.97 g/cm^{3}
Melting point	2,310 °C (4,190 °F; 2,580 K)

Structure
Crystal structure	cubic, cF8
Space group	Fm3̅m, No. 225

Related compounds
Other anions	Yttrium nitride Yttrium phosphide Yttrium(III) arsenide
Other cations	Scandium antimonide Lutetium antimonide
- Except where otherwise noted, data are given for materials in their standard state (at 25 °C [77 °F], 100 kPa). verify (what is ?) Infobox references

Yttrium(III) antimonide (YSb) is an inorganic chemical compound.

Yttrium antimonide is an intermetallic compound with the chemical formula YSb. It has a NaCl-type structure and is stable in the air. Its thermal expansion coefficient (α, 10−6/°) is 11.1.

It can be produced by the high-temperature reaction of sodium antimonide and anhydrous yttrium chloride:

YCl_{3} + Na_{3}Sb → YSb + 3 NaCl
