= Mac NC =

Apple's network computer prototype

- The Apple logo during Mac NC prototyping
- Developer: Apple Computer, Inc.
- Type: Thin client / network computer
- Introductory price: Under US$1,000
- Discontinued: c. 1998
- CPU: "near-300 MHz" PowerPC G3
- Display: 17-inch

The Mac NC or Macintosh NC is an unreleased personal computer prototype design by Apple Computer, Inc. in 1997. The design is Apple's planned implementation of the multi-vendor Network Computer Reference Profile (NCRP), a set of specifications for low-cost thin client devices intended to challenge the monopoly of Microsoft Windows-based PCs. According to a CNET report, one likely configuration was for the Mac NC to run a version of Mac OS connected to server computers running Apple's Rhapsody operating system. The project was publicly championed by then-Apple board member Larry Ellison, the CEO of Oracle Corporation, who framed the network computer concept as a strategic assault on Microsoft's monopoly.

The project's advancement precipitated a fundamental strategic conflict within Apple following the return of Steve Jobs. Ellison's vision was for a server-centric device focused on low total cost of ownership for enterprise customers, which he attempted to impose from his seat on Apple's board. This clashed with the radically different path being formulated by Jobs, which was centered on a "user-first" philosophy and powerful, self-contained personal computers. Jobs issued a sharp, public rebuke of Ellison's announcement of the project and ultimately canceled it.

The Mac NC was never displayed or released, but its underlying concepts were redistributed for two other Apple products. The project's consumer-facing ambition for a simple, Internet-ready machine was realized in the iMac G3, which saved Apple from bankruptcy. The Mac NC's core technical architecture of a diskless, network-bootable client was meticulously preserved and redeployed as NetBoot, a niche-focused technology that became a cornerstone of Mac OS X Server.

== Background ==
In the mid-1990s, the personal computer industry was defined by the explosion of the World Wide Web and the already entrenched duopoly of the Wintel platform. A typical multimedia PC then retailed for about $2,000 (equivalent to about $4,200 in 2025) and the market was fundamentally disrupted during the 1996 holiday shopping season when sub-$1,000 machines first became widely available, a new category so explosively popular it captured 20% of the U.S. retail market by January 1997. The concept of the Network Computer (NC) emerged not merely as a product category, but as a revolutionary ideology championed by industry giants to reshape the computing landscape. The philosophical architect of the NC movement was Oracle CEO Larry Ellison, who gave a negative critique of the personal computer as a "ridiculous device" due to its escalating complexity and cost. Ellison explicitly framed the NC initiative as a proxy war against Microsoft. He declared that Oracle was "in the business of breaking other people's monopolies" and that the NC, by offloading computation to servers and relying on open standards, would render Windows irrelevant.

To turn this vision into a viable platform, Oracle, Sun Microsystems, IBM, Netscape, and Apple Computer, Inc. formed an alliance in May 1996 to create the Network Computer Reference Profile (NCRP). Apple's initial entry is the Pippin, a Macintosh based appliance platform licensed to third parties like Bandai. Marketed with a deeply conflicted identity as a game console, multimedia player, and Internet appliance, the Pippin was a resounding commercial failure, with fewer than 12,000 units sold in the U.S. and being discontinued by Jobs in 1997. The Pippin's failure provided Jobs with a perfect negative case study of the unfocused product strategy he was determined to excise from the company.

== Development and cancellation ==
When Steve Jobs returned to the near-bankrupt Apple in 1997, he instituted a mandate for radical simplicity, famously illustrated by a 2x2 grid that reduced Apple's entire product line to just four categories: Consumer, Professional, Desktop, and Portable. In this environment of strategic triage, Larry Ellison made an announcement from his new seat on Apple's board. On December 10, 1997, during a speech at the Harvard Computer Society, Ellison announced that Apple would release a "Macintosh NC" by April 1998, describing a device with a "near 300" MHz processor and a price below $1,000 (equivalent to about $2,000 in 2025).

As Apple's interim CEO, Jobs immediately, unequivocally, and publicly issued a statement to refute Ellison's claims: "Unfortunately, [Ellison] is pretty far off base [...] Maybe he is trying to deflect interest from what we are really doing". The public clash signaled to the board and the market that the company's product roadmap would be dictated by Jobs's user-centric philosophy, not by a server-centric vision imported from Oracle. The move was consistent with Jobs's concurrent termination of the Macintosh cloning program, a broader strategy to ensure that Mac OS ran exclusively on Apple branded hardware. The Mac NC was ultimately canceled because it was fundamentally incompatible with Jobs's vision for Apple's recovery and survival. It was a niche product for IT managers that had no place in the simple, consumer-focused four-quadrant grid. No prototypes were ever displayed, but contemporary reports confirmed Ellison's description of a machine with a PowerPC G3 processor.

== Legacy ==
The Mac NC's core concepts were distributed to other products. The iMac G3 was unveiled on May 6, 1998. Like the NC, it was conceived as a low cost, all in one device for consumers but Jobs recalibrated the project to be a full-featured, self sufficient personal computer. It is a quintessential "fat client" designed for an unparalleled out-of-box experience. It succeeded where the NC failed because it solved the problem of complexity for the user, hiding its power behind a friendly design that made the Internet accessible and fun.

The core technology of a network-bootable Macintosh was officially released in 1999 as NetBoot, a key feature of Mac OS X Server. NetBoot allows multiple Mac clients to boot from a single, server-based disk image, providing a single point of administration for the institutional markets the original NC initiative had targeted. A technical prerequisite for NetBoot is Apple's New World ROM architecture, and the iMac G3 is one of the first Mac models to include it. With its standard Ethernet port, any iMac G3 becomes a NetBoot client by holding down the "N" key at startup.

== See also ==
- Java ring
- History of Apple Inc.
