= Lanthanum acetate =

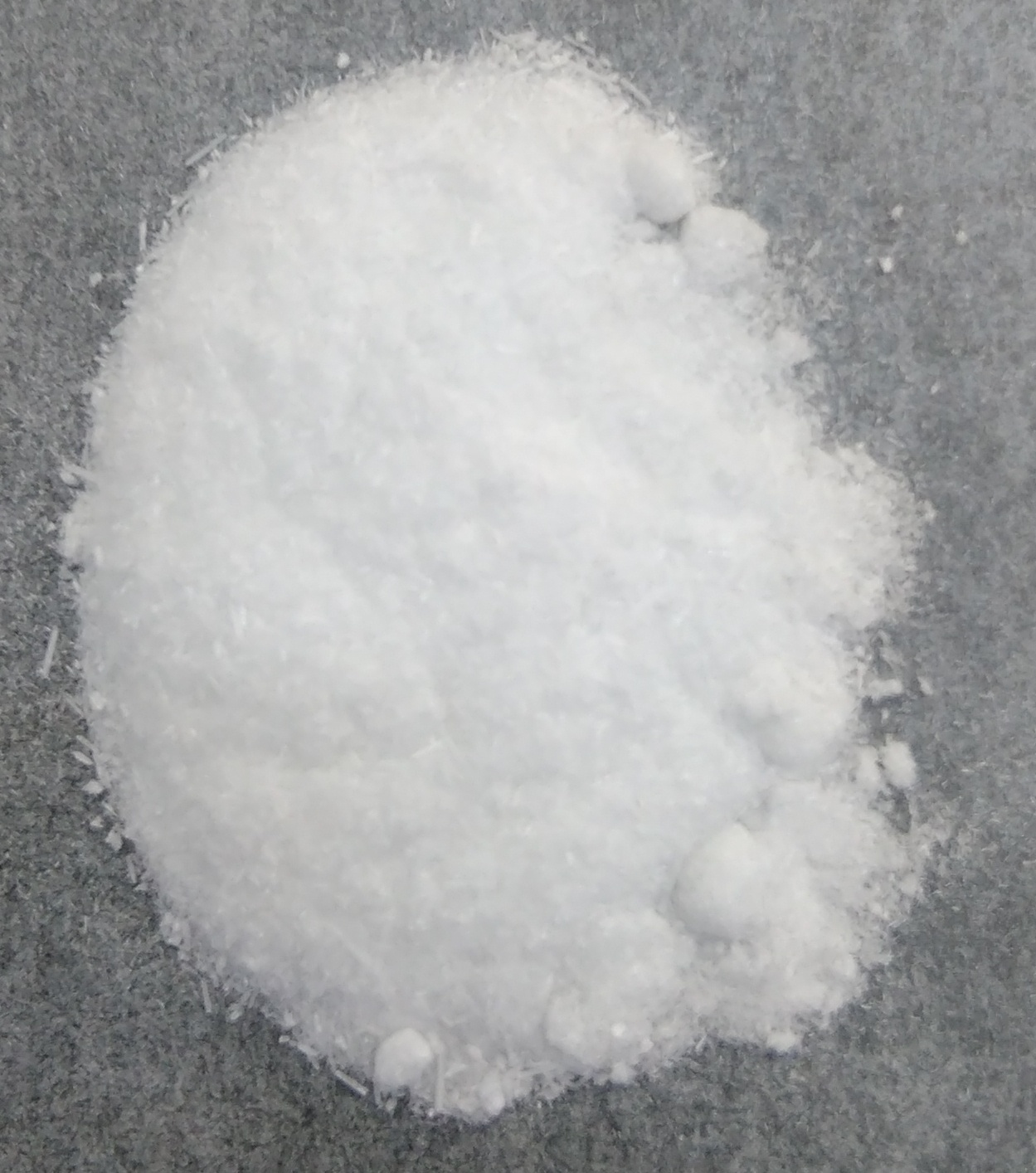

Names
- Other names lanthanum(3+);acetate, lanthanum triacetate

Identifiers
CAS Number	917-70-4
3D model (JSmol)	Interactive image
ChemSpider	12923
ECHA InfoCard	100.011.850
EC Number	213-034-8
PubChem CID	13511
UNII	G91Y2QLF3J
CompTox Dashboard (EPA)	7061275
- InChI: InChI=1S/3C2H4O2.La/c3*1-2(3)4;/h3*1H3,(H,3,4);/q;;;+3/p-3 Key: JLRJWBUSTKIQQH-UHFFFAOYSA-K
- SMILES: CC(=O)[O-].CC(=O)[O-].CC(=O)[O-].[La+3]

Properties
Chemical formula	C_{6}H_{9}LaO_{6}
Molar mass	316.039 g/mol
Appearance	colorless crystals
Density	g/cm^{3}
Solubility in water	soluble

Hazards
- GHS labelling
Pictograms	(GHS05: Corrosive) (GHS09: Environmental hazard)
Signal word	Danger
- Except where otherwise noted, data are given for materials in their standard state (at 25 °C [77 °F], 100 kPa). Infobox references

Lanthanum acetate is an inorganic compound, a salt of lanthanum with acetic acid with the chemical formula La(CH_{3}CO_{2})_{3}. According to X-ray crystallography, anhydrous lanthanum acetate is a coordination polymer. Each La(III) center is nine-coordinate, with two bidentate acetate ligands and the remaining sites occupied by oxygens provided by bridging acetate ligands. The praseodymium and holmium compounds are isostructural.

== Synthesis ==
Lanthanum acetate can be formed by the reaction of lanthanum(III) oxide and acetic anhydride:

La_{2}O_{3} + 3(CH_{3}CO)_{2}O → 2La(CH_{3}COO)_{3}

It is also made in a reaction of lanthanum oxide with 50% acetic acid:

La_{2}O_{3} + 6CH_{3}COOH → 2La(CH_{3}COO)_{3} + 3H_{2}O

== Physical properties ==
Lanthanum(III) acetate forms colorless crystals.

Lanthanum acetate dissolves in water.

Lanthanum acetate forms hydrates of the composition La(CH_{3}COO)_{3}•nH_{2}O, where n = 1 and 1.5.

Lanthanum acetate and its hydrates decompose when heated.

== Uses ==
Lanthanum acetate is used in specialty glass manufacturing and in water treatment.

Also, it is used to produce porous lanthanum oxyfluoride (LaOF) films.

It is also used as a component in the production of ceramic products and as a catalyst in the pharmaceutical industry.
