= Server change number =

The Server Change Number (SCN) is a counter variable used in Client/Server Architecture systems to find out whether the server state could be synchronized with the state of the client. In case of a difference, there have been obviously communication problems.

The number is incremented once the server has successfully integrated changes coming from the client in the case of a server-side event. The counter is incremented once more, if the changes made by the programmer are committed.
