= Yttrium phosphide =

Names
- IUPAC name Phosphanylidyneyttrium
- Other names Yttrium phosphide, yttrium(III) phosphide.

Identifiers
CAS Number	12294-01-8
3D model (JSmol)	Interactive image
ChemSpider	74895
ECHA InfoCard	100.032.318
EC Number	235-563-3
PubChem CID	83012
CompTox Dashboard (EPA)	DTXSID701318962
- InChI: InChI=1S/P.Y Key: DWDQAMUKGDBIGM-UHFFFAOYSA-N
- SMILES: P#[Y]

Properties
Chemical formula	PY
Molar mass	119.879600
Appearance	Colourless solid
Density	4.35 g/cm^{3}
Melting point	200.78 °C (393.40 °F; 473.93 K)
Boiling point	511.30 °C (952.34 °F; 784.45 K)

Structure
Crystal structure	Rock salt structure
Space group	Fm3̅m
Lattice constant	a = 0.5661 nm
Formula units (Z)	4
Coordination geometry	Octahedral at Y^{3+}, Octahedral at P^{3-}

Related compounds
Other anions	Yttrium nitride Yttrium(III) arsenide Yttrium(III) antimonide
Other cations	Scandium phosphide Lutetium phosphide
- Except where otherwise noted, data are given for materials in their standard state (at 25 °C [77 °F], 100 kPa). Infobox references

Yttrium phosphide is an inorganic compound of yttrium and phosphorus with the chemical formula YP. The compound may be also classified as yttrium(III) phosphide.

== Synthesis ==
Heating (500–1000 °C) of pure substances in a vacuum:

4 Y + P_{4} → 4 YP

== Properties ==
Yttrium phosphide forms cubic crystals.

== Uses ==
Ytttium phosphide is a semiconductor used in laser diodes, and in high power and frequency applications.
