= Scandium nitride =

Names
- IUPAC name Scandium nitride
- Other names Azanylidynescandium; Nitridoscandium

Identifiers
| CAS Number | 25764-12-9 |
| 3D model (JSmol) | Interactive image |
| ChemSpider | 105117 |
| ECHA InfoCard | 100.042.938 |
| EC Number | 247-247-2 |
| PubChem CID | 117629 |
| CompTox Dashboard (EPA) | DTXSID9067142 |
- InChI: InChI=1S/N.Sc Key: CUOITRGULIVMPC-UHFFFAOYSA-N
- SMILES: N#[Sc]

Properties
| Chemical formula | ScN |
| Molar mass | 58.963 |
| Density | 4.4 g/cm^{3} |
| Melting point | 2,600 °C (4,710 °F; 2,870 K) |

Hazards
- GHS labelling
| Pictograms | (GHS07: Exclamation mark) |
| Signal word | Danger |
| Hazard statements | H228 |

Related compounds
| Other anions | Scandium phosphide Scandium arsenide Scandium antimonide Scandium bismuthide |
| Other cations | Yttrium nitride Lutetium nitride |
- Except where otherwise noted, data are given for materials in their standard state (at 25 °C [77 °F], 100 kPa). Infobox references

Scandium nitride (ScN) is a binary III-V indirect bandgap semiconductor. It is composed of the scandium cation and the nitride anion. It forms crystals that can be grown on tungsten foil through sublimation and recondensation. It has a rock-salt crystal structure with octahedral bonding coordination. It exhibits lattice constant of 0.451 nm and an indirect bandgap of 0.9 eV and direct bandgap of 2 to 2.4 eV. These crystals can be synthesized by dissolving nitrogen gas with indium-scandium melts, magnetron sputtering, Molecular Beam Epitaxy (MBE), HVPE and other deposition methods. Scandium nitride is also an effective gate for semiconductors on a silicon dioxide (SiO_{2}) or hafnium dioxide (HfO_{2}) substrate. Scandium nitride is the first nitride semiconductor reported to be synthesized without an active Nitrogen plasma source using the Molecular Beam Epitaxy (MBE) technique. It exhibits a scavenging effect, in which scandium at the growth front dissociates molecular nitrogen and incorporates it into the lattice. Scandium nitride can be potentially used in thermoelectric materials as a semiconducting layer in epitaxial single-crystalline metal/semiconductor superlattices for thermoelectric, plasmonic and thermophotonic applications, and as a substrate material for high-quality GaN-based devices and other solid-state applications.
