= Yttrium perchlorate =

Names
- Other names Yttrium triperchlorate, yttrium(III) perchlorate

Identifiers
| CAS Number | 14017-56-2 |
| 3D model (JSmol) | Interactive image |
| ChemSpider | 20100835 |
| ECHA InfoCard | 100.034.388 |
| EC Number | 237-842-5 |
| PubChem CID | 16212899 |
- InChI: InChI=1S/3ClHO4.Y/c3*2-1(3,4)5;/h3*(H,2,3,4,5);/q;;;+3/p-3 Key: IVPOFHHOVYEBFC-UHFFFAOYSA-K
- SMILES: [Y+3].O=Cl(=O)(=O)[O-].[O-]Cl(=O)(=O)=O.[O-]Cl(=O)(=O)=O

Properties
| Chemical formula | Y(ClO_{4})_{3} |
| Molar mass | 387.244 |
| Appearance | liquid |
| Density | g/cm^{–3} |
| Solubility in water | soluble |

Hazards
- Occupational safety and health (OHS/OSH)
| Main hazards | Oxidizer |
- GHS labelling
| Pictograms | (GHS05: Corrosive) (GHS03: Oxidizing) |
| Signal word | Danger |
| Precautionary statements | P210, P220, P260, P264, P280, P301+P330+P331, P302+P361+P354, P304+P340, P305+P354+P338, P316, P321, P363, P370+P378, P405, P501 |
- Except where otherwise noted, data are given for materials in their standard state (at 25 °C [77 °F], 100 kPa). Infobox references

Yttrium perchlorate is the inorganic compound with the chemical formula Y(ClO_{4})_{3}. The compound is an yttrium salt of perchloric acid.

== Synthesis ==
Dissolving yttrium oxide in perchloric acid solution can produce yttrium perchlorate octahydrate.

== Chemical properties ==
Potentially explosive.

== Physical properties ==
The compound is soluble in water and forms a hexahydrate with the formula Y(ClO_{4})_{3}•6H_{2}O.
