= Open Blueprint =

Open Blueprint was an IBM framework developed in the early 1990s (and released in March 1992) that provided a standard for connecting network computers. The open blueprint structure reduced redundancy by combining protocols.
