= Yttrium(III) arsenide =

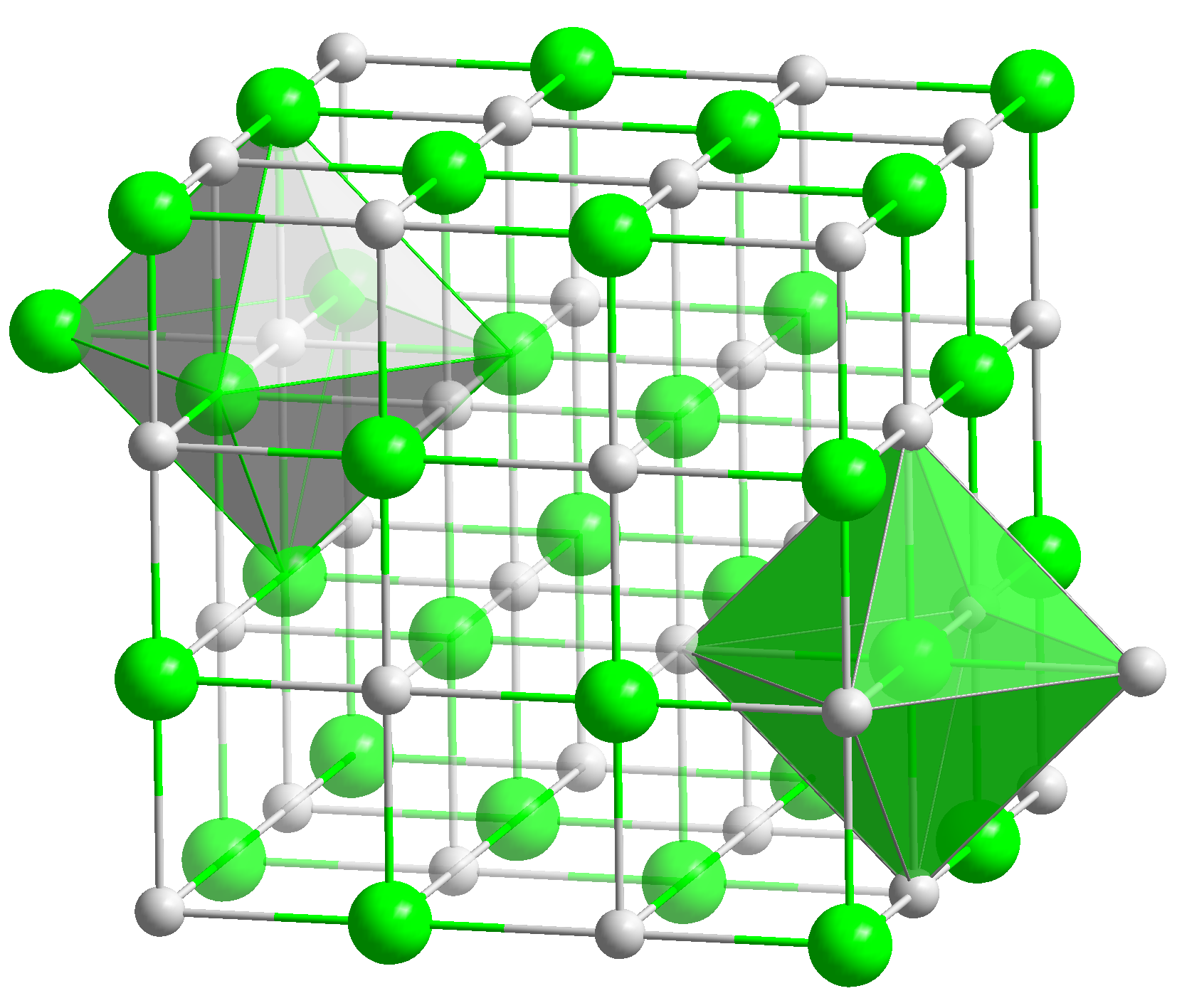

Names
- IUPAC name Yttrium(III) arsenide
- Other names Yttrium arsenide

Identifiers
CAS Number	12255-48-0
3D model (JSmol)	Interactive image
ChemSpider	74887
ECHA InfoCard	100.032.267
EC Number	235-507-8
PubChem CID	83003
CompTox Dashboard (EPA)	DTXSID001045756
- InChI: InChI=1S/As.Y Key: PAEUXJLYHBSEMI-UHFFFAOYSA-N
- SMILES: [As].[Y]

Properties
Chemical formula	YAs
Molar mass	163.828 g/mol
Appearance	cubic crystals
Density	5.59 g/cm^{3}

Structure
Crystal structure	cubic, cF8
Space group	Fm3̅m, No. 225

Related compounds
Other anions	Yttrium nitride Yttrium phosphide Yttrium(III) antimonide
Other cations	Scandium arsenide Lutetium arsenide
- Except where otherwise noted, data are given for materials in their standard state (at 25 °C [77 °F], 100 kPa). verify (what is ?) Infobox references

Yttrium arsenide is an inorganic compound of yttrium and arsenic with the chemical formula YAs. It can be prepared by reacting yttrium and arsenic at high temperature. Some literature has done research on the eutectic system of it and zinc arsenide.

It reacts with iron, iron(III) arsenide, iron(III) oxide and yttrium(III) fluoride (for doping) at high temperature to obtain superconducting material YFeAsO_{0.9}F_{0.1} (T_{c}=10.2 K).

== External reading ==
- Taylor JB, Calvert LD, Despault JG, Gabe EJ, Murray JJ (1974-08-01). "The rare-earth arsenides: Non-stoichiometry in the rocksalt phases". Journal of the Less Common Metals. 37 (2): 217–232. doi:10.1016/0022-5088(74)90038-1. Archived from the original on 2018-06-04.
- Kaurav N, Kuo YJ, Joshi G, Choudhary KK, Varshney D (2008-12-01). "High-pressure structural phase transition and elastic properties of yttrium pnictides". High Pressure Research. 28 (4): 651–663. Bibcode:2008HPR....28..651K. doi:10.1080/08957950802348542. ISSN 0895-7959. S2CID 93223534.
- Zhang Z, Guo Y, Robertson J (2020-06-22). "Termination-dependence of Fermi level pinning at rare-earth arsenide/GaAs interfaces". Applied Physics Letters. 116 (25): 251602. Bibcode:2020ApPhL.116y1602Z. doi:10.1063/5.0007479. ISSN 0003-6951. S2CID 226402018. Archived from the original on 2021-09-09.
