= Network Computer Reference Profile =

Network Computer Reference Profile (NC reference profile, NCRP) was a specification for a network computer put forward by Oracle Corporation, endorsed by Sun Microsystems, IBM, Apple Computer, and Netscape, and finalized in 1996.

== NC1 ==
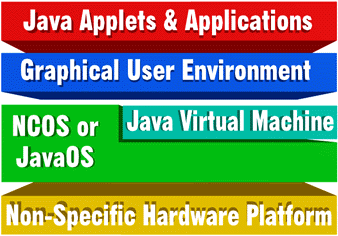
Reference Profile components

The first version of this specification was known as the NC1 Reference Profile.

NCRP specified minimum hardware requirements and software protocols. Among the software requirements were support of IP-based protocols (TCP/IP, FTP, etc.), www standards (HTTP, HTML, Java), email protocols, multimedia file formats, security standards. Operating systems used were NCOS or JavaOS.

The minimum hardware requirements were:

- minimum screen resolution of 640 x 480 (VGA) or equivalent
- pointing device
- text input ability
- audio output

Although this initial NC standard was intended to promote the diskless workstation model of computing, it did not preclude computers with additional features, such as the ability to operate either as a diskless workstation or a conventional fat client. Thus, an ordinary personal computer (PC) having all the required features, could technically be classified as a Network Computer; indeed, Sun noted that contemporary PCs did indeed meet the NC reference requirements.

== StrongARM ==
The reference profile was subsequently revised to use the StrongARM processor.

== Intel ==
After a trip by Ellison to Acer Group headquarters in 1996, he realised the importance to industry of having products based on Intel (x86-compatible) processors. NCI president Jerry Baker noted that "nobody [corporate users] had ever heard of the ARM chip".

== Options ==
Many NCs operated via protocols such as BOOTP, DHCP, RARP and NFS.

Both for ISP-bound and LAN-based reference implementation NCs, a smartcard option was available. This allowed user authentication to be performed in a secure manner, with SSL providing transport security. The smartcard also provided minimal local storage for ISP dialup configuration settings. This configuration data was not required for LAN-based NCs.

== See also ==
- Network Computer, the brand, created by Oracle, for which the NCRP was the specification
