= Neodymium(III) acetylacetonate =

Names
- IUPAC name Tris(acetylacetonato)neodymium(III)
- Systematic IUPAC name Tris[(Z)-4-oxopent-2-en-2-olato-κ^{2}O,O′]neodymium(III)
- Other names Neodymium acetylacetonate, Tris(acetylacetonato)neodymium

Identifiers
CAS Number	64438-52-4 dihydrate; 34777-51-0
3D model (JSmol)	Interactive image
ChemSpider	103881369
PubChem CID	44135659
- InChI: InChI=1S/3C5H7O2.Nd/c3*1-4(6)3-5(2)7;/h3*3H,1-2H3;/q3*-1;+3 Key: AZTDRGMPTCCVFW-UHFFFAOYSA-N
- SMILES: CC(=O)[CH-]C(=O)C.CC(=O)[CH-]C(=O)C.CC(=O)[CH-]C(=O)C.[Nd+3]

Properties
Chemical formula	C_{15}H_{25}NdO_{8}
Molar mass	477.599 g·mol^{−1}
Appearance	White powder
Melting point	150 °C (302 °F; 423 K)
- Except where otherwise noted, data are given for materials in their standard state (at 25 °C [77 °F], 100 kPa). Infobox references

Neodymium(III) acetylacetonate is a coordination compound with the chemical formula Nd(O_{2}C_{5}H_{7})_{3}. Although many sources discuss this anhydrous acetylacetonate complex, it is the dihydrate Nd(O_{2}C_{5}H_{7})_{3}(H_{2}O)_{2} that has been characterized by X-ray crystallography. It commonly occurs as a white powder. Upon heating under vacuum, other dihydrated lanthanide trisacetylacetonates convert to oxo-clusters M_{4}O(C_{5}H_{7}O_{2})_{10}. This result suggests that Nd(O_{2}C_{5}H_{7})_{3} may not exist.

== Preparation ==
Neodymium(III) acetylacetonate can be obtained by treating a neodymium alkoxide with acetylacetone, or by electrolysis of neodymium in acetylacetone.
