= Neoware =

Computer manufacturer

Neoware Systems, Inc.
- Type: Public
- Industry: Computer Systems
- Founded: 1992
- Successor: Hewlett-Packard
- Headquarters: King of Prussia, Pennsylvania
- Key people: Klaus Besier, CEO
- Products: Thin clients
- Website: neoware.com at the Wayback Machine (archived 2006-04-23)

Neoware Systems, Inc., was a company that manufactured and marketed thin clients. It also developed and marketed enterprise software, thin client appliances, and related services aimed at reducing the total cost of ownership (TCO) of IT infrastructure.

Neoware owned one of the three available "OS Streaming" technologies that make it possible to remote boot diskless computers under Microsoft Windows and Linux.

On July 23, 2007, HP announced that it has signed a definitive merger agreement to purchase Neoware for $241 million. The acquisition was completed on October 1, 2007.

== Products ==
- Thin clients
- Neoware TeemTalk (Pericom was acquired July 2003)
- Neoware Image Manager (Qualystem Technology S.A.S. was acquired April 2005)
- LBT Linux-Based Terminal
- ezRemote Manager
- Thintune Linux/Manager (the brand was acquired from eSeSIX in March 2005)
- Neoware Device Manager
- NeoLinux 4
- Windows XPe
- Windows CE
