= Lanthanum acetylacetonate =

Names
- IUPAC name Tris(acetylacetonato)lanthanum(III)
- Systematic IUPAC name Tris[(Z)-4-oxopent-2-en-2-olato-κ^{2}O,O′]lanthanum(III)

Identifiers
CAS Number	14284-88-9 anhydrous; 22392-66-1 dihydrate
3D model (JSmol)	Interactive image
ChemSpider	68023795
EC Number	238-187-8
PubChem CID	131873665
CompTox Dashboard (EPA)	DTXSID201305750
- InChI: InChI=1S/3C5H7O2.La/c3*1-4(6)3-5(2)7;/h3*3H,1-2H3;/q3*-1;+3 Key: UUYNRMJIFVOQCR-UHFFFAOYSA-N
- SMILES: CC(=O)[CH-]C(=O)C.CC(=O)[CH-]C(=O)C.CC(=O)[CH-]C(=O)C.[La+3]

Properties
Chemical formula	C_{15}H_{21}LaO_{6}
Molar mass	436.232 g·mol^{−1}

Hazards
- GHS labelling
Pictograms	(GHS07: Exclamation mark)
Signal word	Warning
Hazard statements	H315, H319, H335
Precautionary statements	P261, P264, P264+P265, P271, P280, P302+P352, P304+P340, P305+P351+P338, P319, P321, P332+P317, P337+P317, P362+P364, P403+P233, P405, P501
- Except where otherwise noted, data are given for materials in their standard state (at 25 °C [77 °F], 100 kPa). Infobox references

Lanthanum acetylacetonate refers to the coordination complex with the formula La(C_{5}H_{7}O_{2})_{3}. This anhydrous acetylacetonate complex has not been characterized well, but the dihydrate La(C_{5}H_{7}O_{2})_{3}(H_{2}O)_{2} has been characterized by X-ray crystallography.

Upon heating under vacuum, the dihydrate converts to the oxo-cluster La_{4}O(C_{5}H_{7}O_{2})_{10}. This behavior is also observed for erbium, yttrium, gadolinium, and europium.

The instability constants (logY_{n}) are 3.65, 5.13 and 6.12 (corresponding to n=1, 2, 3) have been reported for "La(acac)_{3}". It can be prepared by the reaction of lanthanum alkoxide and acetylacetone. Its tetrahydrate decomposes into monohydrate at 110 °C, obtains the anhydrous form at 150 °C, undergoes La(CH_{3}COO)(acac)_{2} and La(CH_{3}COO)_{2}(acac), and at 180~285 °C lanthanum acetate is produced. It can be used to prepare NaLaS_{2}, La_{2}Zr_{2}O_{7} and other materials.
