= SAP Community Network =

SAP Community (formerly SAP Community Network or SCN) is the official site where the community comes together to share, ask questions, and seek answers regarding SAP-related queries. SAP software users, developers, consultants, mentors and students use the SAP Community Network to get help, share ideas, learn, innovate and connect with others. There are an average of 2 million unique visitors to SCN each month, who use the information that has been shared on the site's has over 430 spaces (sub-groups) dedicated to SAP products, topics, technologies, industries, programming languages (such as ABAP) and more. Almost all spaces contain related discussion threads (forums), blogs, documents, elearning, and polls. There are also several spaces in Chinese, Japanese, Korean, Spanish, Portuguese, German and Russian.

== History ==
The SAP Community Network (SCN) was created in July 2003 as part of the SAP Developer Network.

In 2006, a sub-community for business process experts was created for users that defined their role as business analysts or consultants. After the acquisition of BusinessObjects, the BusinessObjects Diamond community was integrated into SCN at first as the BusinessObjects community and later as the Business Analytics Community. University Alliances Community was launched in 2009 to support collaboration among professors, students, customers and partners worldwide.

Around 2008, the term "SAP Developer Network" no longer adequately described the scope of the community, so it was renamed to SAP Community Network, and later to simply SAP Community. SCN is still colloquially referred to as "SDN".

In March 2012, the SAP Community Network was migrated to a Jive based platform hosted on a new sub-domain: scn.sap.com. The new platform is more robust than the former and finally brings all discussions (forums), blogs and documents into a single space for easier access and use. After the migration, the sub-communities for SDN, BPX and BOC/BA continue to exist in newsletter format.

On April 28, 2013, the SAP Community Network was enhanced with the Jive Gamification Module (JGM). Gamification, the use of game mechanics to make tasks more fun, is used to encourage community engagement on SCN. Included in the implementation are missions (activities that are recorded by the system, such as likes, ratings, comments), badges for completed missions, badges for lifetime points (levels), and badges for specific roles. In the first week after the launch of JGM, community actions increased by 1034% and active members (members with >0 points) increased by 516%. The Gamification Team at SAP/SCN continue to provide new missions that encourage healthy participation in the community.

In October 2016, the SAP Community Network website hosted so far on its own subdomain scn.sap.com was redirected to the subdirectory of the more generic Community portal of the main SAP website. The SAP Community Network was then renamed more simply as the SAP Community.

In September 2019, the SAP Community website moved again, this time to its own subdomain community.sap.com.

As a consequence of all these migrations, not all content and discussions available on the previous SDN/SCN website were transferred to the new platform each time, which particularly affected and still affects materials related to previous versions or former names of SAP products.
