= Erbium acetylacetonate =

Names
- IUPAC name Tris(acetylacetonato)erbium(III)
- Systematic IUPAC name Tris[(Z)-4-oxopent-2-en-2-olato-κ^{2}O,O′]erbium(III)

Identifiers
CAS Number	14553-08-3 anhydrous; 16788-89-9 trihydrate
3D model (JSmol)	Interactive image
PubChem CID	44135560
- InChI: InChI=1S/3C5H7O2.Er/c3*1-4(6)3-5(2)7;/h3*3H,1-2H3;/q3*-1;+3 Key: FGQSJRDKBCVFHH-UHFFFAOYSA-N
- SMILES: CC(=O)[CH-]C(=O)C.CC(=O)[CH-]C(=O)C.CC(=O)[CH-]C(=O)C.[Er+3]

Properties
Chemical formula	C_{15}H_{21}ErO_{6}
Molar mass	464.586 g·mol^{−1}
Appearance	pink crystals
Melting point	103 °C (376 K)
- Except where otherwise noted, data are given for materials in their standard state (at 25 °C [77 °F], 100 kPa). Infobox references

Erbium acetylacetonate is a coordination compound with the formula Er(C_{5}H_{7}O_{2})_{3}. This anhydrous acetylacetonate complex is often discussed but unlikely to exist per se. The 8-coordinated dihydrate Er(C_{5}H_{7}O_{2})_{3}(H_{2}O)_{2} is a more plausible formula based on the behavior of other lanthanide acetylacetonates. The dihydrate has been characterized by X-ray crystallography.

Upon heating under vacuum, the dihydrate converts to the oxo-cluster Er_{4}O(C_{5}H_{7}O_{2})_{10}. This behavior, which is also observed for other lanthanide acetylacetonates, further illustrates the implausibility of six-coordinate Er(C_{5}H_{7}O_{2})_{3}.
