= Aspergillopeptidase A =

Aspergillopeptidase A may refer to:

- Penicillopepsin, EC 3.4.23.20
- Rhizopuspepsin, EC 3.4.23.21
- Endothiapepsin, EC 3.4.23.22
- Mucorpepsin, EC 3.4.23.23
- Candidapepsin, EC 3.4.23.24
- Saccharopepsin, EC 3.4.23.25
- Rhodotorulapepsin, EC 3.4.23.26
- Physaropepsin, EC 3.4.23.27, now EC 3.4.21.103, physarolisin
- Acrocylindropepsin, EC 3.4.23.28
- Polyporopepsin, EC 3.4.23.29
- Pycnoporopepsin, EC 3.4.23.30
