= Praseodymium monoantimonide =

Names
- Other names: Praseodymium(III) antimony; Antimony-Praseodymium

Identifiers
CAS Number	12066-81-8
3D model (JSmol)	Interactive image
ChemSpider	20137719
EC Number	235-071-9
PubChem CID	20835943
CompTox Dashboard (EPA)	DTXSID30884537
- InChI: InChI=1S/Pr.Sb Key: MHUUNPRVUKWBIV-UHFFFAOYSA-N
- SMILES: [Pr].[Sb]

Properties
Chemical formula	PrSb
Molar mass	262.67 g/mol
Density	6.7 g/cm^{3}
Melting point	2161 or 2170 °C

Related compounds
Other anions	PrN, PrP, PrAs, PrBi, Pr_{2}O_{3}
Other cations	CeSb, NdSb
- Except where otherwise noted, data are given for materials in their standard state (at 25 °C [77 °F], 100 kPa). Infobox references

Praseodymium monoantimonide is a binary inorganic compound of praseodymium and antimony with the formula PrSb.

== Preparation ==
Praseodymium monoantimonide can be prepared by heating praseodymium and antimony in a vacuum:

$$\mathsf{ Pr + Sb \ \xrightarrow{2170^oC}\ PrSb }$$

== Physical properties ==
Praseodymium monoantimonide forms cubic crystals, space group Fm3̅m, cell parameters a = 0.638 nm, Z = 4, and structure like sodium chloride.

The compound melts congruently at 2170 °C or 2161 °C. At a temperature of 1950 °C, a phase transition occurs in the crystals. At a pressure of 13 GPa, a phase transition also occurs.

== See also ==
- Praseodymium arsenide
- Praseodymium bismuthide
