= PRAS =

PRAS or Pras may refer to:

== People ==
- Pras (born 1972), American rapper and member of The Fugees
- Éric Pras (born 1972), French chef
- Jacques Pras (1924–1982), French cyclist
- E. A. S. Prasanna, Indian cricketer, nicknamed Pras

== Other uses ==
- Polynomial-time randomized approximation scheme, in computer science
- Pras (Thessaly), a town of Phthiotis in ancient Thessaly
- Praseodymium arsenide, a chemical compound with formula PrAs

== See also ==
- PRA (disambiguation)
