= Praseodymium monophosphide =

Names
- Other names Phosphanylidynepraseodymium

Identifiers
CAS Number	12066-49-8
3D model (JSmol)	Interactive image
ChemSpider	74805
ECHA InfoCard	100.031.868
EC Number	235-068-2
PubChem CID	82904
CompTox Dashboard (EPA)	DTXSID701309333
- InChI: InChI=1S/P.Pr Key: ZWIUVBLJANXBMO-UHFFFAOYSA-N
- SMILES: P#[Pr]

Properties
Chemical formula	PPr
Molar mass	171.88142 g·mol^{−1}
Appearance	Dark green crystals
Solubility in water	Decomposes in water

Structure
Crystal structure	cubic

Related compounds
Other anions	Praseodymium nitride Praseodymium arsenide Praseodymium antimonide Praseodymium bismuthide
Other cations	Cerium phosphide Neodymium phosphide
- Except where otherwise noted, data are given for materials in their standard state (at 25 °C [77 °F], 100 kPa). Infobox references

Praseodymium monophosphide is an inorganic compound of praseodymium and phosphorus with the chemical formula PrP. The compound forms crystals.

== Synthesis ==
Praseoymium monophosphide can be prepared by heating praseodymium and phosphorus in the presence of iodine vapor:

4 Pr + P_{4} → 4 PrP

== Physical properties ==
Praseodymium monophosphide forms crystals of a cubic system, space group Fm3̅m, with cell parameters a = 0.5872 nm, Z = 4, and structure like sodium chloride NaCl. It melts congruently at 3120 °C.
