= Praseodymium bismuthide =

Chemical compound

Names
- Other names Praseodymium(III) bismuthide Bismuth-Praseodymium

Identifiers
| CAS Number | 12048-31-6 |
| 3D model (JSmol) | Interactive image |
| ChemSpider | 20137889 |
| EC Number | 234-981-3 |
| PubChem CID | 6336908 |
- InChI: InChI=1S/Bi.Pr Key: GXEWOMCEINAZJT-UHFFFAOYSA-N
- SMILES: [Pr].[Bi]

Properties
| Chemical formula | BiPr |
| Molar mass | 349.89 g/mol |
| Density | 8.6 g/cm^{3} |
| Melting point | 1800 °C |
| Critical point (T, P) | −111 kJ/mol |

Structure
| Crystal structure | cubic |
| Space group | Fm3̅m |

Related compounds
| Other anions | PrN, PrP, PrAs, PrSb, Pr_{2}O_{3} |
| Other cations | CeBi, NdBi |
- Except where otherwise noted, data are given for materials in their standard state (at 25 °C [77 °F], 100 kPa). Infobox references

Praseodymium bismuthide is a binary inorganic compound of praseodymium and bismuth with the chemical formula of PrBi. It forms crystals.

== Preparation ==
Praseodymium bismuthide can be prepared by reacting stoichiometric amounts of praseodymium and bismuth at 1800 °C:

$$\mathsf{ Pr + Bi \ \xrightarrow{1800^oC}\ PrBi }$$

== Physical properties ==
Praseodymium bismuthide forms crystals of the cubic crystal system, with space group Fm3̅m, cell parameters a = 0.64631 nm, Z = 4, and a structure like sodium chloride NaCl. The compound melts congruently at a temperature of roughly 1800 °С. At a pressure of 14 GPa, it undergoes a phase transition.

== See also ==
- Praseodymium arsenide
- Praseodymium antimonide
