= Peptidase A =

Peptidase A may refer to:

- Cytosol nonspecific dipeptidase, an enzyme
- Penicillopepsin, an enzyme
