= Scytalidopepsin A =

Enzyme

Identifiers
- EC no.: 3.4.23.31
- CAS no.: 42613-34-3

Databases
- IntEnz: IntEnz view
- BRENDA: BRENDA entry
- ExPASy: NiceZyme view
- KEGG: KEGG entry
- MetaCyc: metabolic pathway
- PRIAM: profile
- PDB structures: RCSB PDB PDBe PDBsum
Search
- PMC: articles
- PubMed: articles
- NCBI: proteins

Scytalidopepsin A (EC 3.4.23.31, Scytalidium aspartic proteinase A, Scytalidium lignicolum aspartic proteinase, Scytalidium lignicolum aspartic proteinase A-2, Scytalidium lignicolum aspartic proteinase A-I, Scytalidium lignicolum aspartic proteinase C, Scytalidium lignicolum carboxyl proteinase, Scytalidium lignicolum acid proteinase) is an enzyme. This enzyme catalyses the following chemical reaction

Hydrolysis of proteins with specificity similar to that of pepsin A, but also cleaves Cys(SO_{3}H)^{7}-Gly and Leu^{17}-Val in the B chain of insulin

This enzyme is isolated from the fungus Scytalidium lignicolum.
