= Thermopsin =

Type of enzyme

Identifiers
- EC no.: 3.4.23.42
- CAS no.: 126125-05-1

Databases
- BRENDA: enzyme data
- ExPASy: NiceZyme view
- KEGG: enzyme entry
- MetaCyc: metabolic pathway
- Rhea: reactions
- PDB structures: RCSB PDB PDBe PDBsum
Search
- PMC: articles
- PubMed: articles
- NCBI: proteins

Thermopsin (EC 3.4.23.42) is an enzyme. This enzyme catalyses the following chemical reaction

Similar in specificity to pepsin A preferring bulky hydrophobic amino acids in P1 and P1'

This enzyme is isolated from the thermophilic archaeon Sulfolobus acidocaldarius.
