= PRA =

PRA or Pra may refer to:

== Companies and organisations ==
- The People's Republic of Animation, animation company based in Adelaide, Australia
- Philadelphia Redevelopment Authority, US
- Political Research Associates, American research institute
- PRA Group, an American debt buying company
- PRA Health Sciences, a contract research organisation
- Prison Radio Association, a British prison-based charity
- Prudential Regulation Authority, UK
- US Public Roads Administration, later Federal Highway Administration

== Geography ==
- Pra River (Ghana)
- Pra (Russia)
- Pra', municipality of Genoa, Italy

== Military ==
- Parti du Regroupement Africain (African Regroupment Party), French West Africa
- People's Redemption Army, a rebel group in Democratic Republic of the Congo and Uganda
- People's Revolutionary Army (Grenada)
- Philippine Revolutionary Army

== Science and technology ==
- Panel reactive antibody, an immunological laboratory test
- Pest risk analysis, conducted by regulatory plant health authorities to identify appropriate phytosanitary measures
- Phosphoribosylamine, a biochemical intermediate
- Physical Review A, a scientific journal
- Plasma renin activity in medicine
- Positive relative accommodation
- Primitive recursive arithmetic, a formal system of arithmetic
- Probabilistic risk assessment, an engineering safety analysis
- Progesterone receptor A, one of the isoforms of the progesterone receptor
- Progressive retinal atrophy
- Purported responsible address or Sender ID of an email message
- Saccharopepsin, a yeast proteinase A

== Other ==
- General Urquiza Airport, Paraná, Argentina, IATA code
- Participatory rural appraisal, in international development
- Prahran railway station, Melbourne
- President of the Royal Academy of the United Kingdom
- Presidential Records Act of the United States
- Political Rights Act (Switzerland)
