= Macromolecule =

Very large molecule

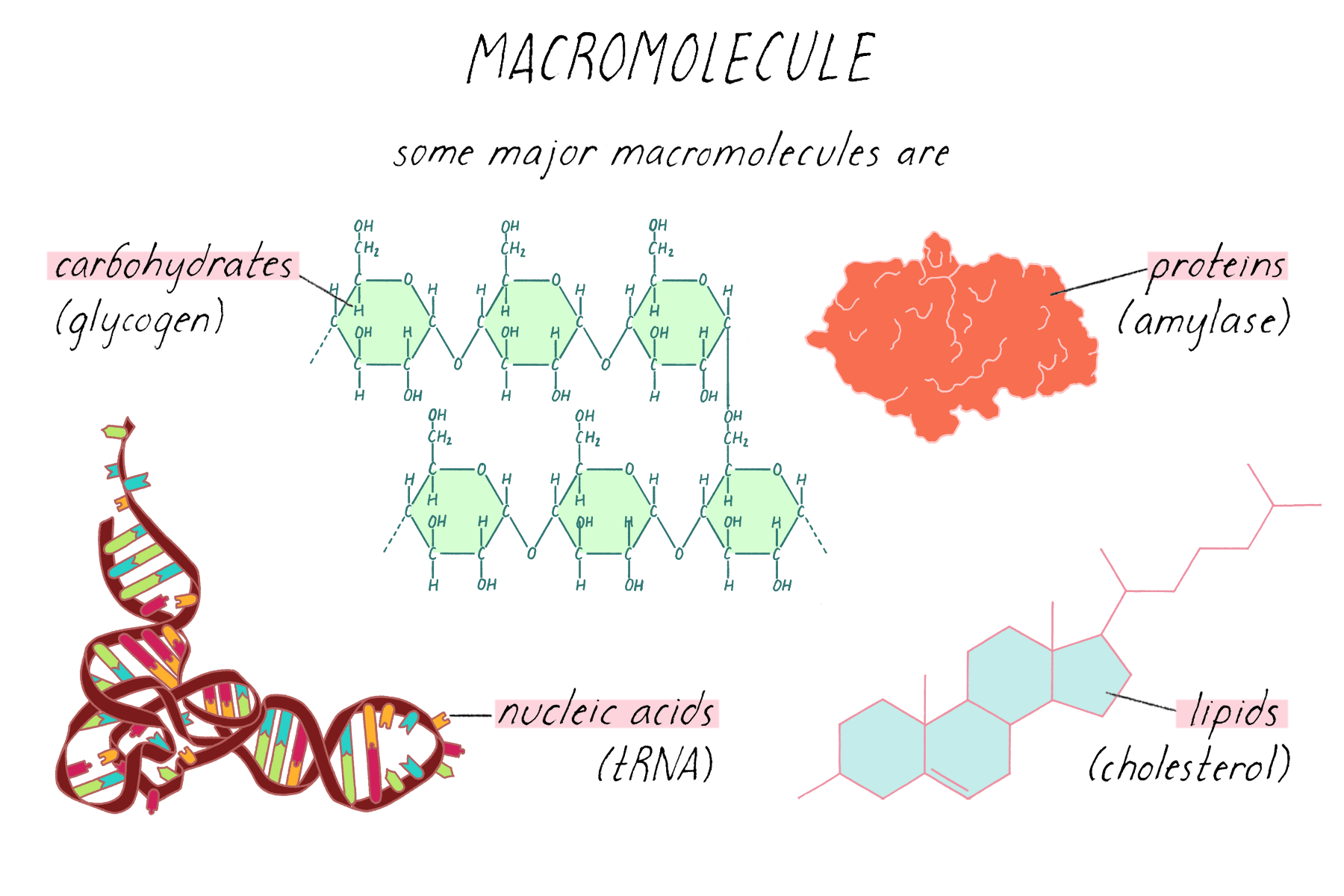
Macromolecules are large, complex molecules in living organisms, including proteins, DNA, RNA, polysaccharides, and lipids.

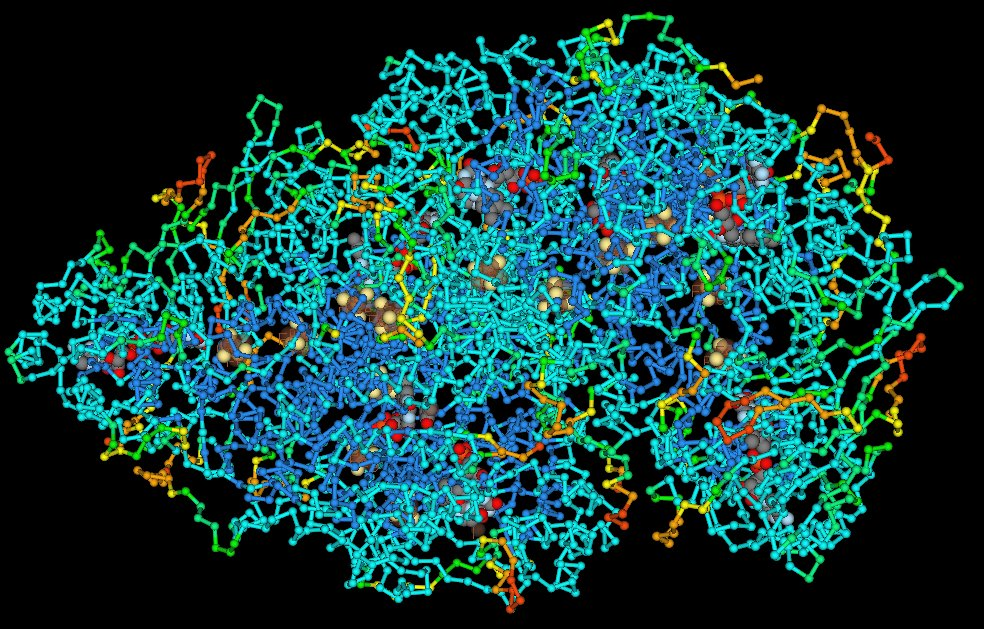
Chemical structure of a polypeptide macromolecule

A macromolecule is a "molecule of high relative molecular mass, the structure of which essentially comprises the multiple repetition of units derived, actually or conceptually, from molecules of low relative molecular mass." Polymers, which are often used in many consumer goods, are examples of macromolecules. Common macromolecules are biopolymers (RNA and DNA, proteins, and carbohydrates), polyolefins (polyethylene) and polyamides (nylon).

== Synthetic macromolecules ==
Polyethyleneterephthalate (PET), used to make beverage containers

Many macromolecules are synthetic polymers (plastics, synthetic fibers, and synthetic rubber). Polyethylene is produced on a particularly large scale such that ethylenes are the primary product in the chemical industry.

Examples or different types of synthetic macromolecules include:

- Thermoplastic polymers
- Thermoset polymers
- Dendrimers
- Vitrimers / Covalent adaptable networks (CANs)
- Covalent organic frameworks (COFs)

When considering organometallic materials within the scope, this may also include metal organic frameworks (MOFs). Additionally, when also considering other non-covalent bonding, such as hydrogen bonds or pi-stacking many different types of supramolecular networks are also included.

== Macromolecules in nature ==
- Proteins are polymers of amino acids joined by peptide bonds.
- DNA and RNA are polymers of nucleotides joined by phosphodiester bonds. These nucleotides consist of a phosphate group, a sugar (ribose in the case of RNA, deoxyribose in the case of DNA), and a nucleotide base (either adenine, guanine, thymine, uracil, or cytosine, where thymine occurs only in DNA and uracil only in RNA).
- Polysaccharides (such as starch, cellulose, and chitin) are polymers of monosaccharides joined by glycosidic bonds.
- Some lipids (organic nonpolar molecules) are macromolecules, with a variety of different structures.

== Linear biopolymers ==
All living organisms are dependent on three essential biopolymers for their biological functions: DNA, RNA and proteins. Each of these molecules is required for life since each plays a distinct, indispensable role in the cell. The simple summary is that DNA makes RNA, and then RNA makes proteins.

DNA, RNA, and proteins all consist of a repeating structure of related building blocks (nucleotides in the case of DNA and RNA, amino acids in the case of proteins). In general, they are all unbranched polymers, and so can be represented in the form of a string. Indeed, they can be viewed as a string of beads, with each bead representing a single nucleotide or amino acid monomer linked together through covalent chemical bonds into a very long chain.

In most cases, the monomers within the chain have a strong propensity to interact with other amino acids or nucleotides. In DNA and RNA, this can take the form of Watson–Crick base pairs (G–C and A–T or A–U), although many more complicated interactions can and do occur.

=== Structural features ===
	DNA	RNA	Proteins
Encodes genetic information	Yes	Yes	No
Catalyzes biological reactions	No	Yes	Yes
Building blocks (type)	Nucleotides	Nucleotides	Amino acids
Building blocks (number)	4	4	20
Strandedness	Double	Single	Single
Structure	Double helix	Complex	Complex
Stability to degradation	High	Variable	Variable
Repair systems	Yes	No	No

Because of the double-stranded nature of DNA, essentially all of the nucleotides take the form of Watson–Crick base pairs between nucleotides on the two complementary strands of the double helix.

In contrast, both RNA and proteins are normally single-stranded. Therefore, they are not constrained by the regular geometry of the DNA double helix, and so fold into complex three-dimensional shapes dependent on their sequence. These different shapes are responsible for many of the common properties of RNA and proteins, including the formation of specific binding pockets, and the ability to catalyse biochemical reactions.

==== DNA is optimised for encoding information ====
DNA is an information storage macromolecule that encodes the complete set of instructions (the genome) that are required to assemble, maintain, and reproduce every living organism.

DNA and RNA are both capable of encoding genetic information, because there are biochemical mechanisms which read the information coded within a DNA or RNA sequence and use it to generate a specified protein. On the other hand, the sequence information of a protein molecule is not used by cells to functionally encode genetic information.

DNA has three primary attributes that allow it to be far better than RNA at encoding genetic information. First, it is normally double-stranded, so that there are a minimum of two copies of the information encoding each gene in every cell. Second, DNA has a much greater stability against breakdown than does RNA, an attribute primarily associated with the absence of the 2'-hydroxyl group within every nucleotide of DNA. Third, highly sophisticated DNA surveillance and repair systems are present which monitor damage to the DNA and repair the sequence when necessary. Analogous systems have not evolved for repairing damaged RNA molecules. Consequently, chromosomes can contain many billions of atoms, arranged in a specific chemical structure.

==== Proteins are optimised for catalysis ====
Proteins are functional macromolecules responsible for catalysing the biochemical reactions that sustain life. Proteins carry out all functions of an organism, for example photosynthesis, neural function, vision, and movement.

The single-stranded nature of protein molecules, together with their composition of 20 or more different amino acid building blocks, allows them to fold into a vast number of different three-dimensional shapes, while providing binding pockets through which they can specifically interact with all manner of molecules. In addition, the chemical diversity of the different amino acids, together with different chemical environments afforded by local 3D structure, enables many proteins to act as enzymes, catalyzing a wide range of specific biochemical transformations within cells. In addition, proteins have evolved the ability to bind a wide range of cofactors and coenzymes, smaller molecules that can endow the protein with specific activities beyond those associated with the polypeptide chain alone.

==== RNA is multifunctional ====
RNA is multifunctional, its primary function is to encode proteins, according to the instructions within a cell's DNA. They control and regulate many aspects of protein synthesis in eukaryotes.

RNA encodes genetic information that can be translated into the amino acid sequence of proteins, as evidenced by the messenger RNA molecules present within every cell, and the RNA genomes of a large number of viruses. The single-stranded nature of RNA, together with tendency for rapid breakdown and a lack of repair systems means that RNA is not so well suited for the long-term storage of genetic information as is DNA.

In addition, RNA is a single-stranded polymer that can, like proteins, fold into a very large number of three-dimensional structures. Some of these structures provide binding sites for other molecules and chemically active centers that can catalyze specific chemical reactions on those bound molecules. The limited number of different building blocks of RNA (4 nucleotides vs >20 amino acids in proteins), together with their lack of chemical diversity, results in catalytic RNA (ribozymes) being generally less-effective catalysts than proteins for most biological reactions.

== Branched biopolymers ==
Idealized structure of lignin from a softwood

Lignin is a pervasive natural macromolecule. It comprises about a third of the mass of trees. Lignin arises by crosslinking. Related to lignin are polyphenols, which consist of a branched structure of multiple phenolic subunits. They can perform structural roles (e.g. lignin) as well as roles as secondary metabolites involved in signalling, pigmentation and defense.

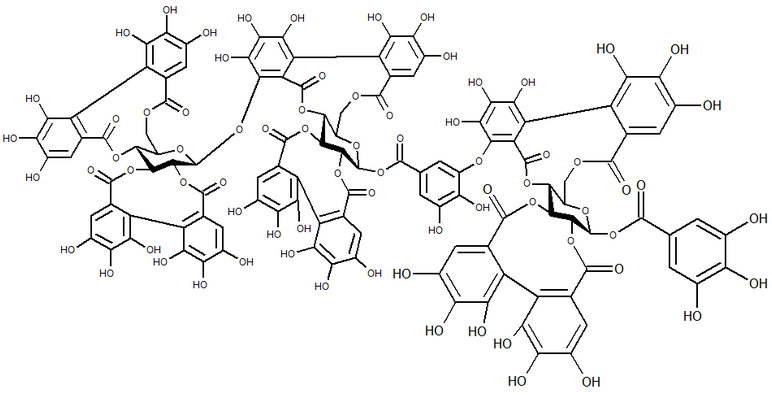
Raspberry ellagitannin, a tannin composed of a core of glucose units surrounded by gallic acid esters and ellagic acid units

Carbohydrate macromolecules (polysaccharides) are formed from polymers of monosaccharides. Because monosaccharides have multiple functional groups, polysaccharides can form linear polymers (e.g. cellulose) or complex branched structures (e.g. glycogen). Polysaccharides perform numerous roles in living organisms, acting as energy stores (e.g. starch) and as structural components (e.g. chitin in arthropods and fungi). Many carbohydrates contain modified monosaccharide units that have had functional groups replaced or removed.

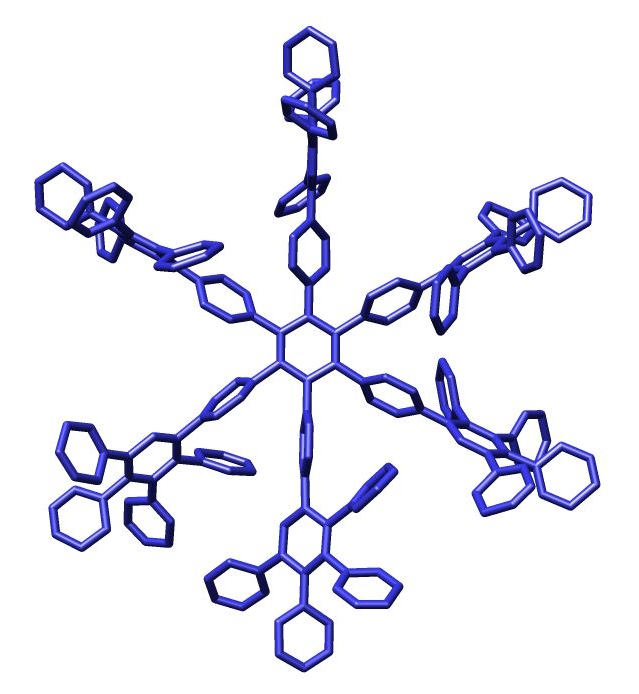
Structure of an example polyphenylene dendrimer macromolecule

== See also ==
- List of biophysically important macromolecular crystal structures
- Small molecule
- Soft matter
