= Acrocylindropepsin =

Class of enzymes

Identifiers
- EC no.: 3.4.23.28
- CAS no.: 37288-84-9

Databases
- IntEnz: IntEnz view
- BRENDA: BRENDA entry
- ExPASy: NiceZyme view
- KEGG: KEGG entry
- MetaCyc: metabolic pathway
- PRIAM: profile
- PDB structures: RCSB PDB PDBe PDBsum
Search
- PMC: articles
- PubMed: articles
- NCBI: proteins

Acrocylindropepsin (EC 3.4.23.28, Acrocylindrium proteinase, Acrocylindrium acid proteinase) is an enzyme. This enzyme catalyses the following chemical reaction

Preference for hydrophobic residues at P1 and P1'. Action on the B chain of insulin is generally similar to that of pepsin A, but it also cleaves Leu6-Cys(SO_{3}H), Glu^{21}-Arg and Asn^{3}-Gln, although not Gln^{4}-His

This enzyme is present in fungus Acrocylindrium sp.
