= Pycnoporopepsin =

Class of enzymes

Identifiers
- EC no.: 3.4.23.30
- CAS no.: 77967-78-3

Databases
- IntEnz: IntEnz view
- BRENDA: BRENDA entry
- ExPASy: NiceZyme view
- KEGG: KEGG entry
- MetaCyc: metabolic pathway
- PRIAM: profile
- PDB structures: RCSB PDB PDBe PDBsum
Search
- PMC: articles
- PubMed: articles
- NCBI: proteins

Pycnoporopepsin (EC 3.4.23.30, proteinase Ia, Pycnoporus coccineus aspartic proteinase, Trametes acid proteinase) is an enzyme. This enzyme catalyses the following chemical reaction

Similar to pepsin A, but narrower, cleaving only three bonds in the B chain of insulin: Ala^{14}-Leu, Tyr^{16}-Leu, and Phe^{24}-Phe

This enzyme is isolated from the basidiomycete Pycnoporus sanguineus.
