= Rhodotorulapepsin =

Enzyme

Identifiers
- EC no.: 3.4.23.26
- CAS no.: 37259-59-9

Databases
- IntEnz: IntEnz view
- BRENDA: BRENDA entry
- ExPASy: NiceZyme view
- KEGG: KEGG entry
- MetaCyc: metabolic pathway
- PRIAM: profile
- PDB structures: RCSB PDB PDBe PDBsum
Search
- PMC: articles
- PubMed: articles
- NCBI: proteins

Rhodotorulapepsin (EC 3.4.23.26, Rhodotorula aspartic proteinase, Cladosporium acid protease, Cladosporium acid proteinase, Cladosporium aspartic proteinase, Paecilomyces proteinase, Rhodotorula glutinis aspartic proteinase, Rhodotorula glutinis acid proteinase, Rhodotorula glutinis aspartic proteinase II, Rhodotorula acid proteinase) is an enzyme. This enzyme catalyses the following chemical reaction:

Specificity similar to that of pepsin A. Cleaves Z-Lys-Ala-Ala-Ala and activates trypsinogen

This enzyme is present in yeast Rhodotorula glutinis.
