= Praseodymium arsenide =

Names
- Other names: Praseodymium(III) arsenide; Arsenic-Praseodymium

Identifiers
| CAS Number | 12044-28-9 |
| 3D model (JSmol) | Interactive image |
| ChemSpider | 74788 |
| ECHA InfoCard | 100.031.763 |
| EC Number | 234-953-0 |
| PubChem CID | 82880 |
| CompTox Dashboard (EPA) | DTXSID501308715 |
- InChI: InChI=1S/As.PrNJQBXEXIDZEJEW-UHFFFAOYSA-N
- SMILES: [As]#[Pr]

Properties
| Chemical formula | PrAs |
| Molar mass | 215.83 g/mol |
| Density | 6.6 g/cm^{3} |

Related compounds
| Other anions | PrN, PrP, PrSb, PrBi, Pr_{2}O_{3} |
| Other cations | CeAs, NdAs |
- Except where otherwise noted, data are given for materials in their standard state (at 25 °C [77 °F], 100 kPa). Infobox references

Praseodymium arsenide is a binary inorganic compound of praseodymium and arsenic with the formula PrAs.

== Preparation ==
Praseodymium arsenide can be prepared by heating praseodymium and arsenic:

$$\mathsf{ Pr + As \ \xrightarrow{T}\ PrAs }$$

== Physical properties ==
Praseodymium arsenide forms cubic crystals, space group F m3m, cell parameters a = 0.6009 nm, Z = 4, and structure like sodium chloride. When heated, it decomposes into arsenic and Pr_{4}As_{3}. At a pressure of 27 GPa, a phase transition to the tetragonal crystal system occurs.

== See also ==
- Praseodymium antimonide
- Praseodymium bismuthide
