= Rhizopuspepsin =

Enzyme

Identifiers
- EC no.: 3.4.23.21
- CAS no.: 2620497

Databases
- IntEnz: IntEnz view
- BRENDA: BRENDA entry
- ExPASy: NiceZyme view
- KEGG: KEGG entry
- MetaCyc: metabolic pathway
- PRIAM: profile
- PDB structures: RCSB PDB PDBe PDBsum
Search
- PMC: articles
- PubMed: articles
- NCBI: proteins

Rhizopuspepsin (EC 3.4.23.21, Rhizopus aspartic proteinase, neurase, Rhizopus acid protease, Rhizopus acid proteinase) is an enzyme. This enzyme catalyses the following chemical reaction

Hydrolysis of proteins with broad specificity similar to that of pepsin A, preferring hydrophobic residues at P1 and P1'. Clots milk and activates trypsinogen.

From the zygomycete fungus Rhizopus chinensis. A similar endopeptidase is found in R. niveus [2]. In peptidase family A1 (pepsin A family).
