= Praseodymium diantimonide =

Names
- Other names Praseodymium antimonide

Identifiers
CAS Number	12440-49-2
CompTox Dashboard (EPA)	DTXSID70779170

Properties
Chemical formula	PrSb_{2}
Molar mass	384.43 g/mol
Density	7.38 g/cm^{3}

Structure
Crystal structure	Orthorhombic, SmSb_{2} type
Space group	Cmce, No. 64
Lattice constant	a = 0.6224 nm, b = 0.6127 nm, c = 1.8144 nm
Formula units (Z)	8
- Except where otherwise noted, data are given for materials in their standard state (at 25 °C [77 °F], 100 kPa). Infobox references

Praseodymium diantimonide is an inorganic compound of praseodymium and antimony with the chemical formula PrSb_{2}. It is a layered metallic compound that crystallizes in the orthorhombic SmSb_{2}-type structure. PrSb_{2} undergoes a charge-density wave transition near 100 K and orders antiferromagnetically near 5 K.

== Preparation ==
Praseodymium diantimonide can be prepared by reaction of praseodymium and antimony at high temperature:

Pr + 2 Sb → PrSb_{2}

The Pr–Sb phase diagram contains PrSb_{2} together with several more praseodymium-rich antimonides, including PrSb, Pr_{4}Sb_{3} and Pr_{5}Sb_{3}.

== Properties ==
=== Crystal structure ===
PrSb_{2} crystallizes in the orthorhombic crystal system with the SmSb_{2}-type structure, space group Cmce (No. 64), historically written Cmca. Representative lattice parameters are a = 6.224 Å, b = 6.127 Å and c = 18.144 Å, with eight formula units per unit cell. The calculated density is approximately 7.38 g/cm^{3}. The structure is strongly layered and contains two crystallographically distinct antimony sites. It is closely related to the structures of other light rare-earth diantimonides and to the ZrSi_{2} structural family.

=== Phase stability and thermochemistry ===
PrSb_{2} forms peritectically at approximately 1100 °C rather than melting congruently. The standard enthalpy of formation has been measured calorimetrically. Borzone et al. reported approximately −97 kJ per mole of atoms, corresponding to about −291 kJ mol^{−1} of PrSb_{2}.

=== Electronic properties ===
PrSb_{2} is a metallic, strongly anisotropic conductor. Its in-plane electrical resistivity is substantially lower than that along the crystallographic c axis, reflecting the nearly two-dimensional electronic structure. The resistivity shows a pronounced anomaly near 100 K. Later Raman-scattering, X-ray-diffraction and transport measurements established that this anomaly corresponds to formation of a charge-density wave. Below the transition, a collective amplitude mode appears in the Raman spectrum. X-ray diffraction shows changes in the thermal evolution of the lattice parameters near 100 K but no change in crystallographic symmetry, indicating strong coupling between the electronic instability and the lattice.

=== Magnetic properties ===
PrSb_{2} orders antiferromagnetically at approximately 5.1 K. The magnetic response is strongly anisotropic as a result of crystal-field splitting of the Pr^{3+} levels. Applied magnetic fields in the ordered phase produce metamagnetic transitions. Two transitions have been observed near 0.4 T and 1.4 T under ambient pressure. Hydrostatic pressure increases the Néel temperature, with reported pressure coefficients of approximately 1.3–1.6 K GPa^{−1}. Hall-effect measurements have more recently found an additional contribution to the Hall resistivity within the antiferromagnetic phase, interpreted as a topological Hall effect. The effect weakens under pressure and nearly disappears when the charge-density-wave state is suppressed near 1 GPa.
