= Political rights act (Switzerland) =

Swiss law regulating the exercise of political rights in Switzerland

Political Rights Act (PRA)
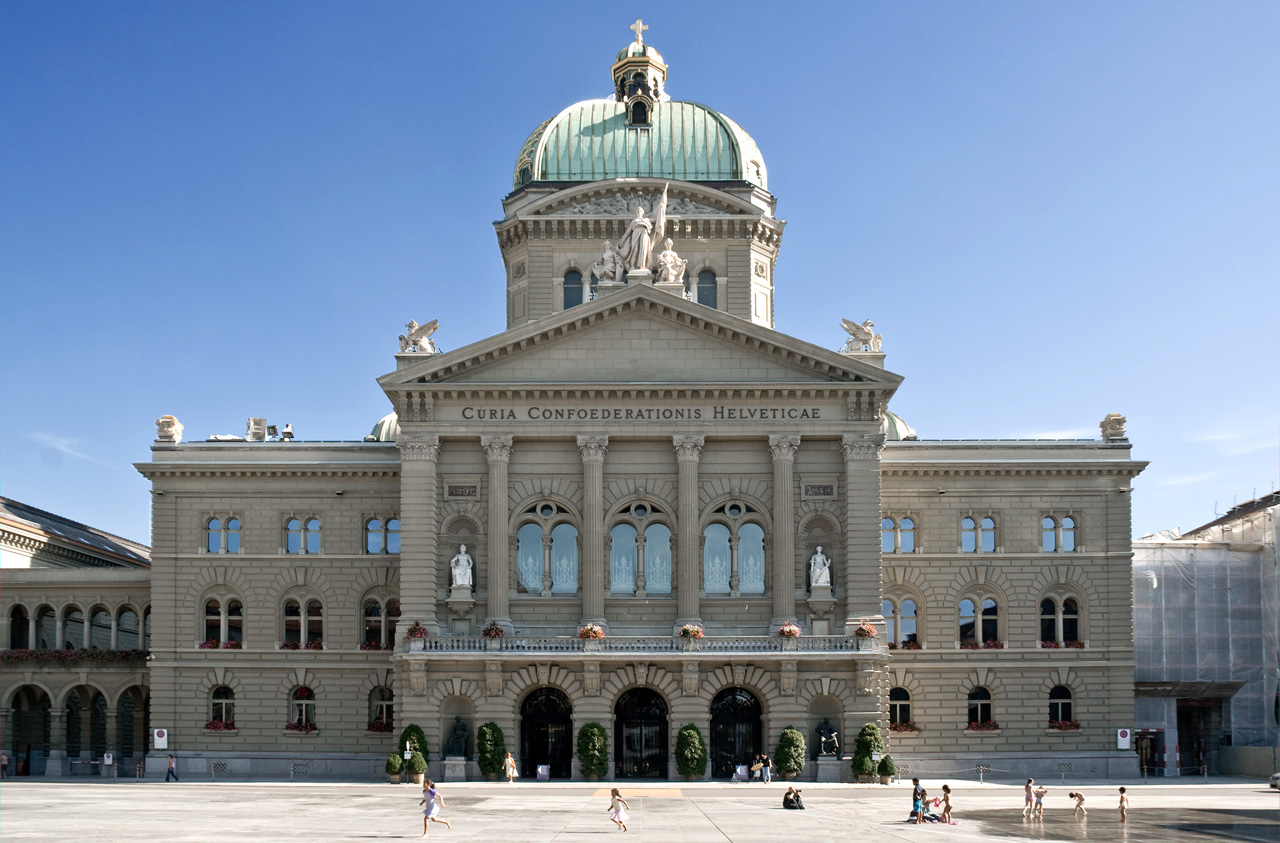

Federal Assembly of Switzerland
- Long title: Federal Act on Political Rights (SR 161.1)
- Territorial extent: Switzerland
- Enacted by: Federal Assembly of Switzerland
- Enacted: 17 December 1976
- Commenced: 1 July 1978
- Status: Current legislation

The Political Rights Act (PRA) (Note: German: Bundesgesetz über die politischen Rechte, BPR; French: Loi fédérale sur les droits politiques, LDP; Italian: Legge federale sui diritti politici, LDP), federal act on political rights, is a Swiss federal law that regulates the exercise of political rights (votations and elections) in Switzerland. The law was adopted on 17 December 1976 by the Federal Assembly and came into force on 1 July 1978.

The PRA outlines the rights of Swiss citizens with regard to political participation at the federal level. It covers various aspects of the political process, including referendums, popular initiatives, and the election of the national council. The act doesn't apply to cantonal and communal votes, which are governed by cantonal laws. However, the act delegates the conduct of federal votes to cantons and communes (e.g., voters registration, counting of votes, appeals).

The PRA complements and details the provisions established in the Swiss constitution (title 4 and 5).

== Previous laws ==
When introduced in 1978, the law replaced six former federal laws:

1. Federal law on federal elections and votes (19 July 1872, RS 161.1) (Note: French: loi fédérale sur les élections et les votations fédérales)
2. Federal law concerning popular votes on federal laws and decrees (17 June 1874; RS 162.2) (Note: French: loi fédérale concernant les votations populaires sur les lois et arrêtés fédéraux)
3. Federal law concerning the election of the National Council (14 February 1919; RS 263.2) (Note: French: loi fédérale concernant l'élection du Conseil national)
4. Federal law on the procedure for popular initiatives concerning the revision of the constitution (23 March 1962; RS 162.1) (Note: French: loi fédérale concernant le mode de procéder pour les initiatives populaires relatives à la revision de la constitution)
5. Federal law on the distribution of deputies to the National Council among the cantons (8 March 1963; RS 163.1) (Note: French: loi fédérale répartissant entre les cantons les députés au Conseil national)
6. Federal law establishing facilities for federal votes and elections (25 June 1965; RS 161.2) (Note: French: loi fédérale instituant des facilités en matière de votations et d'élections fédérales)

== See also ==
- Voting in Switzerland
