= Mucorpepsin =

Identifiers
- EC no.: 3.4.23.23
- CAS no.: 148465-73-0

Databases
- IntEnz: IntEnz view
- BRENDA: BRENDA entry
- ExPASy: NiceZyme view
- KEGG: KEGG entry
- MetaCyc: metabolic pathway
- PRIAM: profile
- PDB structures: RCSB PDB PDBe PDBsum
Search
- PMC: articles
- PubMed: articles
- NCBI: proteins

Mucorpepsin (EC 3.4.23.23, Mucor rennin, Mucor aspartic proteinase, Mucor acid proteinase, Mucor acid protease, Mucor miehei aspartic proteinase, Mucor miehei aspartic protease, Mucor pusillus emporase, Fromase 100, Mucor pusillus rennin, Fromase 46TL, Mucor miehei rennin) is an enzyme . This enzyme catalyses the following chemical reaction

Hydrolysis of proteins, favouring hydrophobic residues at P1 and P1'. Clots milk. Does not accept Lys at P1, and hence does not activate trypsinogen

This enzyme is isolated from the zygomycete fungi Mucor pusillus and M. miehei.
