= Polyporopepsin =

Enzyme which clots milk

Identifiers
- EC no.: 3.4.23.29
- CAS no.: 61573-73-7

Databases
- IntEnz: IntEnz view
- BRENDA: BRENDA entry
- ExPASy: NiceZyme view
- KEGG: KEGG entry
- MetaCyc: metabolic pathway
- PRIAM: profile
- PDB structures: RCSB PDB PDBe PDBsum
Search
- PMC: articles
- PubMed: articles
- NCBI: proteins

Polyporopepsin, also called Polyporus aspartic proteinase, Irpex lacteus aspartic proteinase or Irpex lacteus carboxyl proteinase B, is an enzyme found in the fungus Irpex lacteus. It catalyses the following chemical reaction:

Milk clotting activity, broad specificity, but fails to cleave Leu^{15}-Tyr or Tyr^{16}-Leu of insulin B chain.

Irpex lacteus is a basidiomycete also known as Polyporus tulipiferae.
