= Candidapepsin =

Type of enzyme

Identifiers
- EC no.: 3.4.23.24
- CAS no.: 69458-91-9

Databases
- BRENDA: enzyme data
- ExPASy: NiceZyme view
- KEGG: enzyme entry
- MetaCyc: metabolic pathway
- Rhea: reactions
- PDB structures: RCSB PDB PDBe PDBsum
Search
- PMC: articles
- PubMed: articles
- NCBI: proteins

Candidapepsin (EC 3.4.23.24, Candida albicans aspartic proteinase, Candida albicans carboxyl proteinase, Candida albicans secretory acid proteinase, Candida olea acid proteinase, Candida aspartic proteinase, Candida olea aspartic proteinase) is an enzyme. This enzyme catalyses the following chemical reaction

Preferential cleavage at the carboxyl of hydrophobic amino acids, but fails to cleave Leu^{15}-Tyr, Tyr^{16}-Leu and Phe^{24}-Phe of insulin B chain. Activates trypsinogen, and degrades keratin

This endopeptidase is present in yeast Candida albicans.
