= Endothiapepsin =

Identifiers
- EC no.: 3.4.23.22
- CAS no.: 37205-60-0

Databases
- IntEnz: IntEnz view
- BRENDA: BRENDA entry
- ExPASy: NiceZyme view
- KEGG: KEGG entry
- MetaCyc: metabolic pathway
- PRIAM: profile
- PDB structures: RCSB PDB PDBe PDBsum
Search
- PMC: articles
- PubMed: articles
- NCBI: proteins

Endothiapepsin (EC 3.4.23.22, Endothia aspartic proteinase, Endothia acid proteinase, Endothia parasitica acid proteinase, Endothia parasitica aspartic proteinase) is an enzyme. This enzyme catalyses the following chemical reaction

Hydrolysis of proteins with specificity similar to that of pepsin A; prefers hydrophobic residues at P1 and P1', but does not cleave Ala14-Leu in the B chain of insulin or Z-Glu-Tyr. Clots milk

This enzyme is isolated from the ascomycete Endothia parasitica.
