= Praseodymium antimonide =

Praseodymium antimonide may refer to:

- Praseodymium monoantimonide, PrSb
- Praseodymium diantimonide, PrSb_{2}
