= Saccharopepsin =

Identifiers
- EC no.: 3.4.23.25
- CAS no.: 37228-80-1

Databases
- IntEnz: IntEnz view
- BRENDA: BRENDA entry
- ExPASy: NiceZyme view
- KEGG: KEGG entry
- MetaCyc: metabolic pathway
- PRIAM: profile
- PDB structures: RCSB PDB PDBe PDBsum
Search
- PMC: articles
- PubMed: articles
- NCBI: proteins

Saccharopepsin (EC 3.4.23.25, yeast endopeptidase A, Saccharomyces aspartic proteinase, aspartic proteinase yscA, proteinase A, proteinase yscA, yeast proteinase A, Saccharomyces cerevisiae aspartic proteinase A, PRA) is an enzyme. This enzyme catalyses the following chemical reaction

Hydrolysis of proteins with broad specificity for peptide bonds. Cleaves -Leu-Leu-Val-Tyr bond in a synthetic substrate.

This enzyme is present in baker's yeast (Saccharomyces cerevisiae).

Proteinase A is an aspartic proteinase found in Saccharomyces cerevisiae, commonly called “Brewer’s Yeast” or “Baker’s Yeast” and is used in the fermentation processes of beer and wine making. Fermentation can cause stress conditions for Saccharomyces cerevisiae and proteinase A can be excreted from the cell.

Structure

Proteinase A is relatively simple protein and is 329 amino acid residues in length. It is composed of both alpha helices and beta pleated sheets, with beta pleated sheets being the prevailing structure.

Proteinase A has two symmetrical lobes. The lobes are folded so that an aspartic acid from each lobe line up to form the active site of the protein. The structure of proteinase A is stabilized by two separate disulfide bridges, one in each lobe. The structure also includes a malleable sheet composed of beta pleated sheets that can cover and uncover the active site.
