= Penicillopepsin =

Identifiers
- EC no.: 3.4.23.20
- CAS no.: 2620465

Databases
- IntEnz: IntEnz view
- BRENDA: BRENDA entry
- ExPASy: NiceZyme view
- KEGG: KEGG entry
- MetaCyc: metabolic pathway
- PRIAM: profile
- PDB structures: RCSB PDB PDBe PDBsum
Search
- PMC: articles
- PubMed: articles
- NCBI: proteins

Penicillopepsin (EC 3.4.23.20, peptidase A, Penicillium janthinellum aspartic proteinase, acid protease A, Penicillium citrinum acid proteinase, Penicillium cyclopium acid proteinase, Penicillium expansum acid proteinase, Penicillium janthinellum acid proteinase, Penicillium expansum aspartic proteinase, Penicillium aspartic proteinase, Penicillium caseicolum aspartic proteinase, Penicillium roqueforti acid proteinase, Penicillium duponti aspartic proteinase, Penicillium citrinum aspartic proteinase) is an enzyme. This enzyme catalyses the following chemical reaction

Hydrolysis of proteins with broad specificity similar to that of pepsin A, preferring hydrophobic residues at P1 and P1', but also cleaving Gly^{20}-Glu in the B chain of insulin. Clots milk, and activates trypsinogen

This enzyme is present in fungus Penicillium janthinellum.
