= Praseodymium(III) nitride =

Names
- Other names azanylidynepraseodymium, praseodymium(III) nitride

Identifiers
CAS Number	25764-09-4
3D model (JSmol)	Interactive image
ChemSpider	105114
ECHA InfoCard	100.042.935
EC Number	247-244-6
PubChem CID	117626
CompTox Dashboard (EPA)	DTXSID0067139
- InChI: InChI=1S/N.Pr Key: JCWZBEIBQMTAIH-UHFFFAOYSA-N
- SMILES: N#[Pr]

Properties
Chemical formula	NPr
Molar mass	154.915 g·mol^{−1}
Appearance	black crystals
Density	7.46 g/cm^{3}
Solubility in water	reacts with water

Hazards
- GHS labelling
Pictograms	(GHS07: Exclamation mark)
Signal word	Warning
Hazard statements	H315, H319, H335
Precautionary statements	P261, P264, P271, P280, P302+P352, P304+P340, P305+P351+P338, P312, P321, P332+P313, P337+P313, P362, P403+P233, P405, P501
- Except where otherwise noted, data are given for materials in their standard state (at 25 °C [77 °F], 100 kPa). Infobox references

Praseodymium(III) nitride is a binary inorganic compound of praseodymium and nitrogen. Its chemical formula is PrN. The compound forms black crystals, and reacts with water.

== Preparation ==
Praseodymium(III) nitride can be prepared by the reaction of nitrogen and metallic praseodymium on heating:

2 Pr + N_{2} → 2 PrN

It can also be prepared from the reaction of ammonia and praseodymium metal on heating:

2 Pr + 2 NH_{3} → 2 PrN + 3 H_{2}

== Properties ==
Praseodymium(III) nitride forms black crystals of a cubic system. The space group is Fm3m, with cell parameter a = 0.5165 nm, Z = 4, its structure similar to that of sodium chloride (NaCl).

The compound is readily hydrolyzed with water and reacts with acids.

== Applications ==
The compound is used in high-end electric and semiconductor products, and as a raw material to produce phosphor. Also it is used as a magnetic material and sputtering target material.
