= Pepsin A =

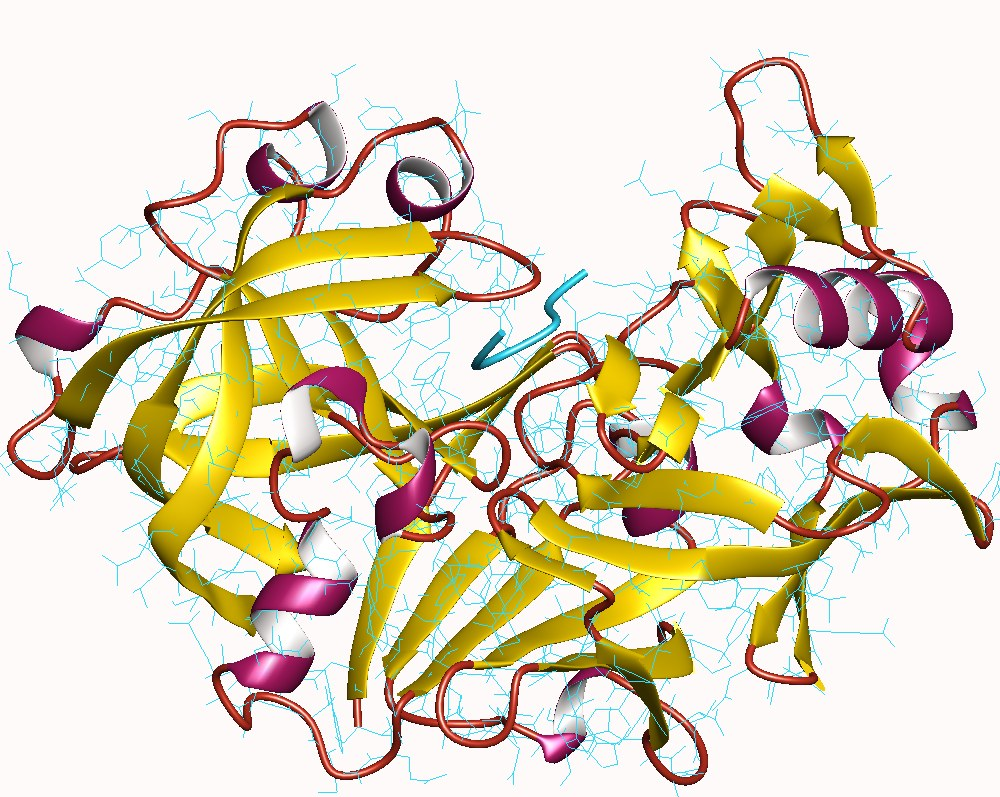
- Pepsin + inhibitor (l.blue), Human

Identifiers
- EC no.: 3.4.23.1
- CAS no.: 9001-75-6

Databases
- IntEnz: IntEnz view
- BRENDA: BRENDA entry
- ExPASy: NiceZyme view
- KEGG: KEGG entry
- MetaCyc: metabolic pathway
- PRIAM: profile
- PDB structures: RCSB PDB PDBe PDBsum
Search
- PMC: articles
- PubMed: articles
- NCBI: proteins

Pepsin A (EC 3.4.23.1, pepsin, lactated pepsin, pepsin fortior, fundus-pepsin, elixir lactate of pepsin, P I, lactated pepsin elixir, P II, pepsin R, pepsin D) is an enzyme. This enzyme catalyses the following chemical reaction

Preferential cleavage: hydrophobic, preferably aromatic, residues in P1 and P1' positions. Cleaves Phe^{1}-Val, Gln^{4}-His, Glu^{13}-Ala, Ala^{14}-Leu, Leu^{15}-Tyr, Tyr^{16}-Leu, Gly^{23}-Phe, Phe^{24}-Phe and Phe^{25}-Tyr bonds in the B chain of insulin

The enzyme is a predominant endopeptidase in the gastric juice of vertebrates.

== See also ==
- Pepsin
