= Victor Zhora =

Ukrainian cybersecurity expert

- Віктор Жора
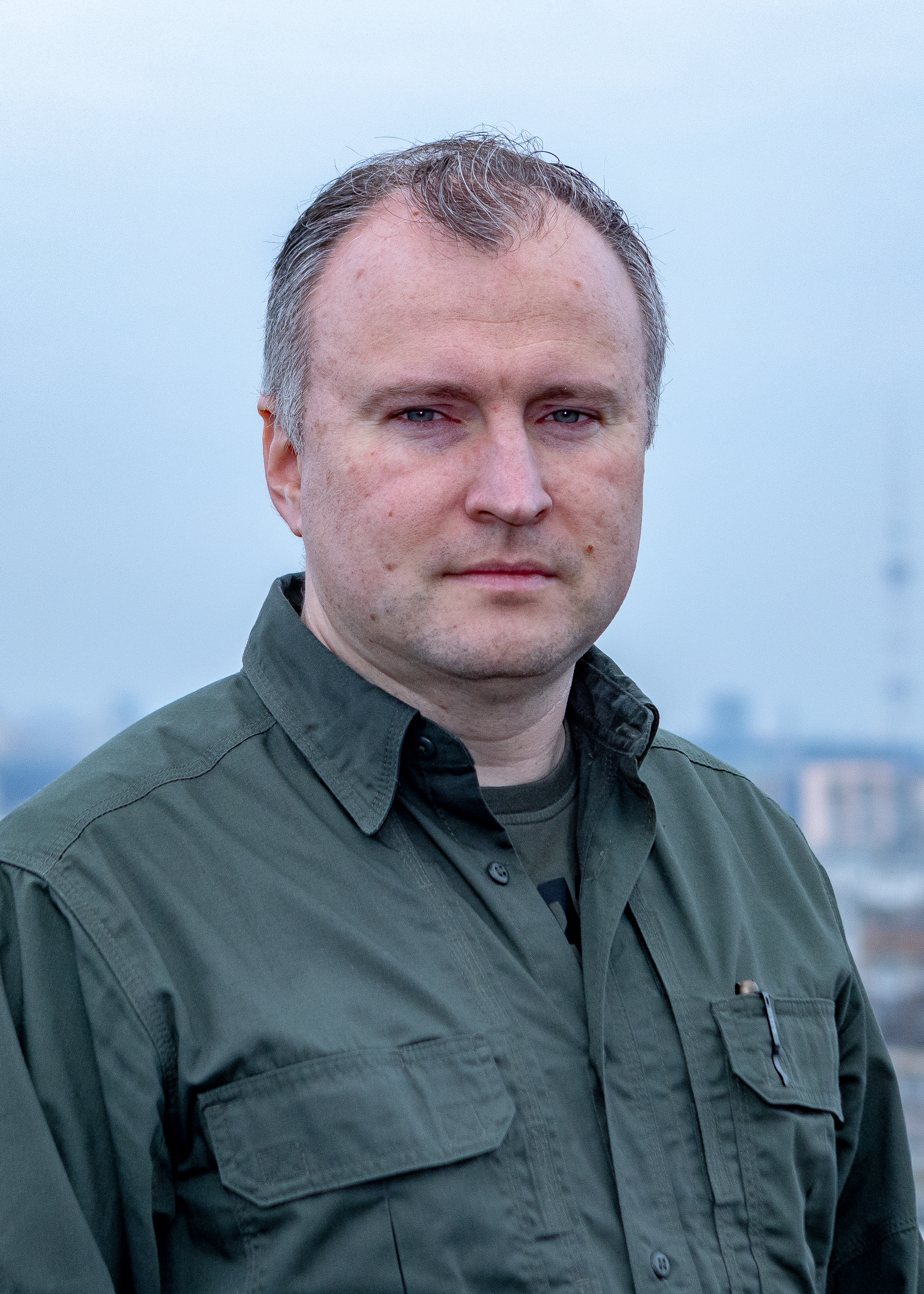

Deputy Chairman, State Special Communications Service of Ukraine
- In office January, 2021 – November, 2023
- Serving under: Yuriy Shchyhol

Military service
- Battles/wars: Russo-Ukrainian War; 2022 Russian invasion of Ukraine; Russo-Ukrainian war (2022–present); Russo-Ukrainian cyberwarfare; 2022 Ukraine cyberattacks

Victor Zhora is a Ukrainian cybersecurity expert currently serving on the front line in Ukraine. He was formerly the Deputy Chairman and one of the Chief commanders of the Ukrainian State Special Communications Service of Ukraine (SSSCIP). He was serving in this capacity during the 2022 Ukraine cyberattack campaigns, mostly having to detect and combat attacks by the GRU during the Russian invasion of Ukraine. He was heavily involved with the sanctioning of operations for the IT Army of Ukraine to counter the aggressive actions taken by Sandworm, Fancy Bear, Primitive Bear, and other hacker groups and collectives based in Russia.

In the beginning of the full-scale invasion Zhora became one of the Ukrainian officials publicly explaining and coordinating the country's cyber defense. On 15 March, 2022, he stated during a call with reporters, that the Viasat hack caused a “huge loss in communications in the very beginning of war“. However, the impact did not completely disrupt communication or, consequently, coordination between the forces. He also worked with international partners on cyber-threat intelligence and defense.

In November 2023, Zhora was fired from his position, having been accused of embezzlement by NABU special investigators. He was arrested after the investigators allegedly found text messages on his phone that indicated criminal behaviors surrounding the purchase of software for SSSCIP and released on ₴10 million bail. In July 2025, however, Zhora was re-enlisted into the Armed Forces of Ukraine, where he is currently serving as a platoon commander near Pokrovsk.Throughout August and September of 2025, multiple court hearings were postponed due to his military service.
