= Viasat hack =

Cyber attack on US communications company Viasat

Viasat Hack; KA-Sat Attack
- Part of Russian invasion of Ukraine
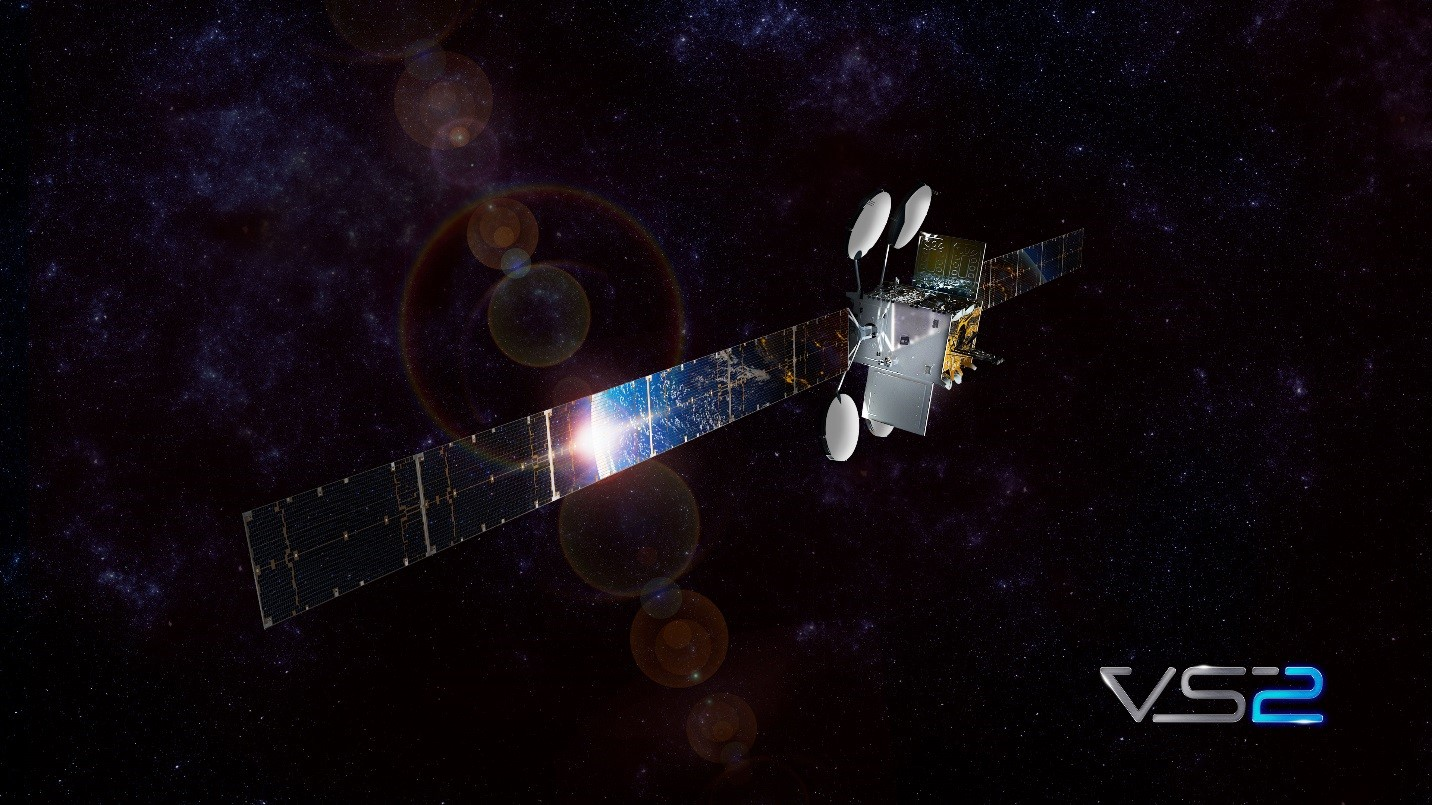
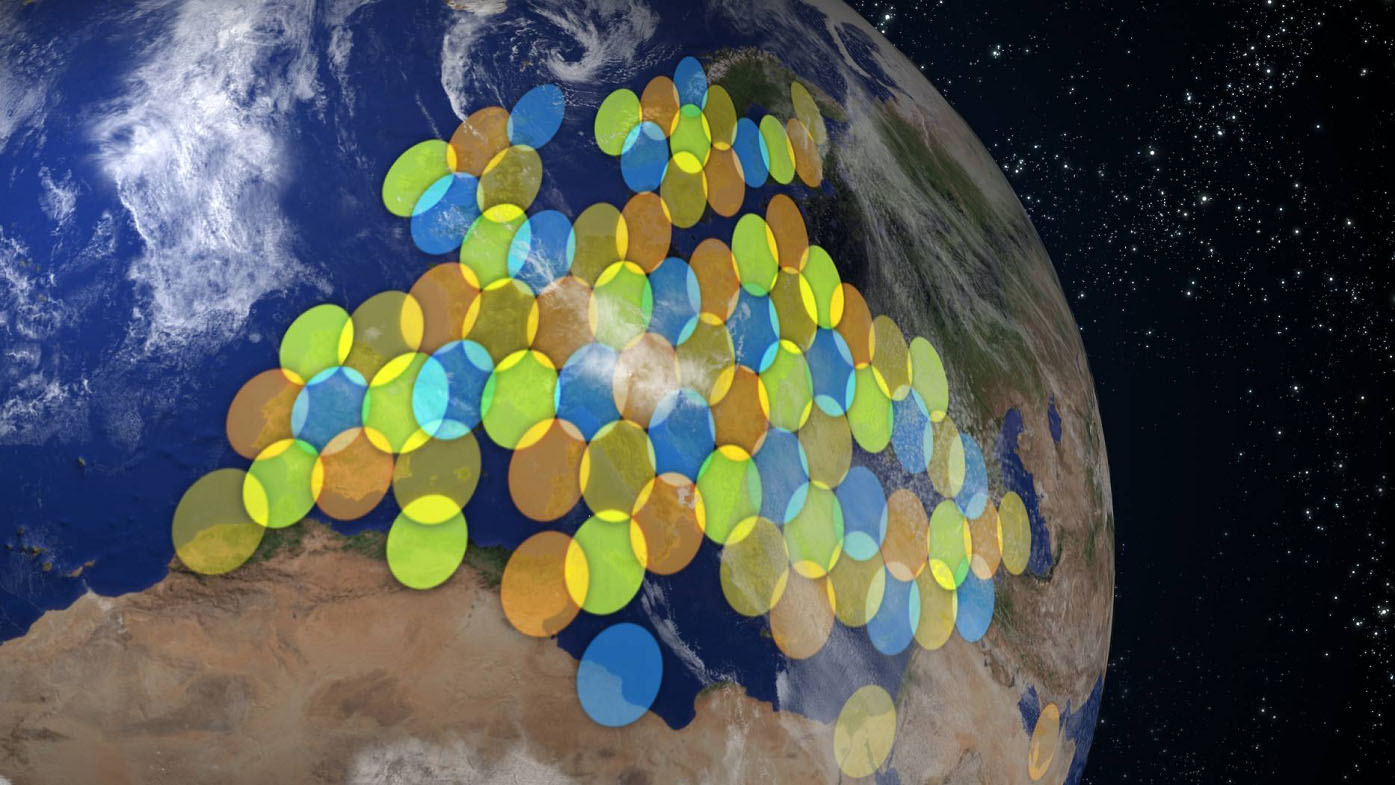
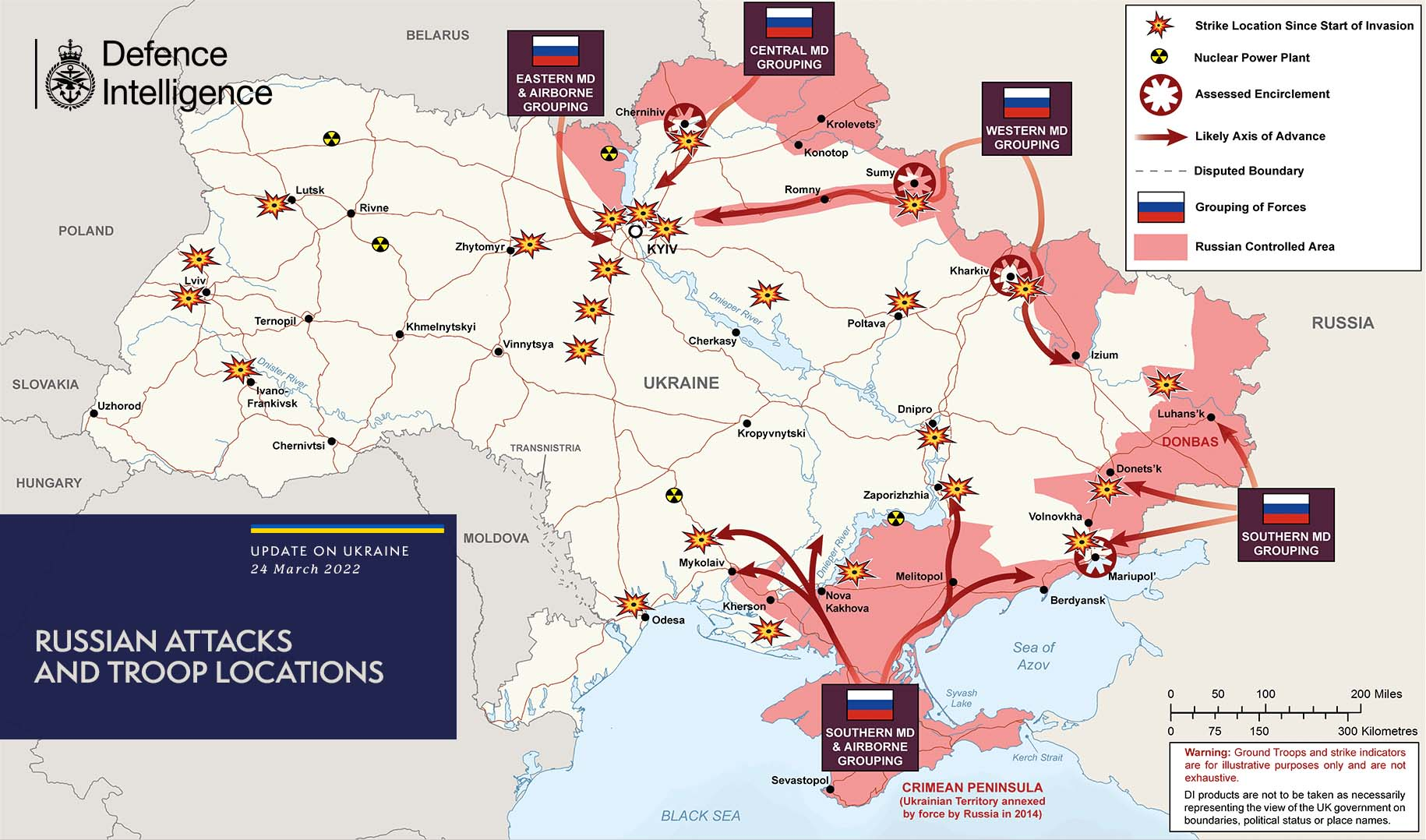
Location	Geostationary Earth Orbit and Ukraine
Action	Russo-Ukrainian cyberwarfare

Belligerents
Russia; GRU	Ukraine; SSSCIP; Viasat; Eutelsat; NSA; (United Kingdom) GCHQ

Commanders and leaders
	Yuriy Shchyhol; Victor Zhora

Malware details
- Technical name: AcidRain
- Type: Wiper malware
- Subtype: Modem / Router firmware Flash memory eraser
- Classification: Cyberwarfare cyberattack
- Family: VPNFilter
- Isolation date: 15 March 2022
- Authors: Fancy Bear, Sandworm

Cyberattack event
- Date: 23-24 February 2022
- Target: (Italy) Eutelsat
- Suspect: (Russia) 5.188.159.169

Technical details AcidRain (SentinelOne / “ukrop” sample) — ELF 32-bit MIPS binary
- Platforms: Modem firmware / KA-SAT; MIPS architecture; SurfBeam2
- Package: Standalone ELF binary
- Filetype: ELF 32-bit MIPS executable
- Abused exploits: Viasat/Skylogic management network
- Written in: Compiled C/C/C++

The Viasat hack was a cyberattack against the satellite internet system of American communications company Viasat which affected their KA-SAT network. The hack happened on the day of Russian invasion of Ukraine. This was a hack in three stages and two events; gaining entry into a facility, uploading a malware to a satellite, and then having that satellite beam that signal back down to Earth, targeted at internet modems throughout Ukraine. Collateral spillover did leak outside of the borders of Ukraine, impacting internet modems in Germany, Scandinavia, the United Kingdom, and elsewhere throughout Europe.

== Events ==
On February 23, 2022, hackers targeted a VPN installation, in a Turin management center managed by Eutelsat, which provided network access to administrators and operators. The hackers gained access to management servers that gave them access to information about company’s modems. After a few hours, the hackers gained access to another server that delivered software updates to the modems which allowed them to deliver the novel wiper malware AcidRain. Wiper malwares are designed to render their targets completely useless.

On 24 February, 2022, the day Russia invaded Ukraine, thousands of Viasat modems went offline. The attack also caused the malfunction in the remote control of 5,800 Enercon wind turbines in Germany and disruptions to thousands of organizations across Europe.

On 15 March, 2022, Ukrainian cybersecurity official Victor Zhora stated during a call with reporters, that the attack caused a “huge loss in communications in the very beginning of war“. However, the impact did not completely disrupt communication or, consequently, coordination between the forces.

On 31 March, 2022, SentinelOne researchers Juan Andres Guerrero-Saade and Max van Amerongen announced the discovery of a new wiper malware codenamed AcidRain designed to permanently disable routers. Viasat later confirmed that the AcidRain malware was used during the 'cyber event'. AcidRain shares code with VPNFilter, a 2018 cyber operation against routers attributed to the Russian military by the FBI.

On 10 May, 2022, the European Union, the United States, and the United Kingdom condemned the attack targeting Viasat's KA-SAT network as a Russian operation.

== See also ==
- Cyberwarfare by Russia
- Russian sabotage operations in Europe
