= Andrii Kudabekov =

Ukrainian entrepreneur, instructor, soldier (1974–2023)

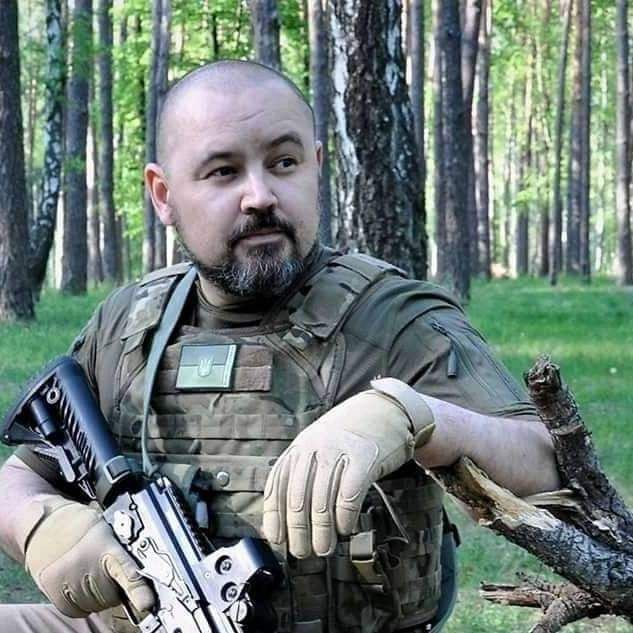
- Native name: Андрій Зейнуллович Кудабеков
- Nickname: Bek (Бек)
- Born: Andrii Zeinulovych Kudabekov; 9 March 1974; Budapest, Hungary
- Died: 31 October 2023 (aged 49) Leonivka, Chernihiv Oblast, Ukraine
- Allegiance: Ukraine
- Branch: Ukrainian Air Force
- Rank: Major
- Conflicts: Russo-Ukrainian War
- Awards: Order of Bohdan Khmelnytsky, 3rd class
- Education: Chernihiv Polytechnic National University

Andrii Kudabekov (Ukrainian: Андрій Зейнуллович Кудабеков; callsign "Bek"; 9 March 1974, Budapest, Hungary - 31 October 2023, Leonivka, Chernihiv Oblast) was a Ukrainian entrepreneur, instructor, and Major in the Special Operations Forces of the Armed Forces of Ukraine. He took part in the Revolution of Dignity and the Russo-Ukrainian War. He was posthumously awarded the Order of Bohdan Khmelnytsky, 3rd class.

== Early life and education ==
Andrii Kudabekov was born on 9 March 1974 in Budapest where his father served in the Soviet military.

From 1990, he lived in Chernihiv where he graduated from Chernihiv Polytechnic National University with a degree in Finance. From 1992 to 1994, he completed his compulsory military service. Later, he became an entrepreneur and founded a company called Furniture Soft as Clouds.

== Military career ==
He was an active participant in the Revolution of Dignity. During clashes with the Berkut riot police on February 18–19, 2014, at Independence Square in Kyiv, he sustained a brain concussion.

In 2014, he joined the Chernihiv Battalion as a volunteer. In August that year, while evacuating the dead and wounded soldiers of the Armed Forces of Ukraine, he was captured by Russian occupants in Horlivka, Donetsk Oblast. He later escaped from captivity and made his way out of the occupied territory.

In November 2014, he joined the Armed Forces of Ukraine and took part in combat in the Donetsk and Luhansk regions. He was demobilized in August 2015.

In 2016 in Chernihiv, he founded the Vovkulaka Veterans' Special Training Center where civilians and servicemen of the Armed Forces of Ukraine were they received tactical training.

In 2019–2021, he served as Deputy Head of a directorate in the State Service of Special Communications and Information Protection of Ukraine (SSSCIP).

In February 2022, he returned from an assignment abroad and joined Ukraine’s defense. He formed and led a Special Operations Forces group in the AFU. He fought in the Siege of Chernihiv and later conducted operations in other parts of the front line.

While carrying out a special mission as part of a Special Operations Forces group on 31 October 2023, he was killed in action, together with Sergeant Dmytro Lovar, when repelling an attack by an enemy sabotage and reconnaissance group in the village of Leonivka, Chernihiv Oblast.

He was buried at Yatseve Cemetery in Chernihiv on 3 November 2023.

== Awards and honors ==
- Order of Bohdan Khmelnytsky, 3rd class (18 June 2024, posthumous) — for personal courage shown in defending the state sovereignty and territorial integrity of Ukraine.
- Knight's Cross of the Volunteer.
- Medal "For the Defence of the Homeland".
- Medal "For Military Valour of Ukraine".
- Medal "For the Defence of Chernihiv" (posthumous).
- Badge of Honour (Ministry of Defence of Ukraine)
- Badge "War Veteran - Participant in Combat Operations".
- Awarded a service firearm - PM (Makarov) pistol.

== Military ranks ==
- Lieutenant
- Major

== Bibliography ==
- "Андрій Кудабеков". Платформа пам'яті Меморіал (in Ukrainian).
- "Пам'яті підприємця, спецназівця Андрія Кудабекова (позивний «Бек»)". Укрінформ (in Ukrainian). 2023-11-06.
- "Під час виконання завдання на півночі Чернігівщини загинув спецпризначенець Андрій Кудабеков". Новинарня (in Ukrainian). 2023-11-02.
- "У Чернігові збирають підписи під петицією за присвоєння звання Героя (посмертно) Андрію Кудабекову". Час Чернігівський (in Ukrainian). 2023-12-21.
