= 2026 Carfil sabotage =

- Part of Russo-Ukrainian war and Russian sabotage operations in Europe
- Date: 14 September 2026
- Location: Brașov, Romania
- Type: Arson, alleged Russian sabotage
- Outcome: Fire affecting the premises of several commercial companies; criminal investigation
- Property damage: Carfil industrial platform (€500,000+)
- Arrests: 3 suspects arrested in Poland and Germany
- Suspects: Two Belarusian citizens and one Ukrainian citizen
- Accused: Russia

The 2026 Carfil sabotage refers to a fire that occurred on 14 September 2026 at the Carfil industrial platform in Brașov, near the Carfil SA company, a subsidiary of the national defense contractor ROMARM. On 26 October 2026, the Romanian Intelligence Service (SRI) announced that the fire had been caused by a sabotage network coordinated from Russia, according to the findings of investigations conducted alongside national and international partners.

The Directorate for Investigating Organized Crime and Terrorism (DIICOT) identified three defendants—two Belarusian citizens and one Ukrainian citizen—residing in European Union member states. They are under investigation for attempted acts of diversion, and Romanian authorities have initiated procedures to extradite them to Romania.

== Background ==
The incident at Carfil occurred against the backdrop of security incidents recorded in Romania and the Black Sea region during 2026, in the context of the Russian invasion of Ukraine. These included unauthorized drone incursions into Romanian airspace and incidents involving commercial vessels in the Black Sea.

In April and May 2026, military drones of Russian origin reached the city of Galați, prompting authority intervention and security measures. One of the drones had crashed into an apartment building, causing damage. According to data published by the Ministry of National Defence, 35 unauthorized airspace incursions and 98 attacks near the national border had been recorded by 21 October 2026.

In October 2026, several commercial vessels were involved in maritime incidents near the Romanian coast, with some reported as suspected drone attacks. The security situation in the Black Sea was evaluated during a meeting of the Supreme Council of National Defence (CSAT) on 22 October 2026.

No operational connection between these incidents and the fire on the Carfil industrial platform has been publicly established.

== September 2026 fire ==
On 14 September 2026, a fire broke out on the Carfil industrial platform in Brașov, in the immediate vicinity of CARFIL SA, an arms manufacturer operating under CN ROMARM. The fire damaged the premises of several commercial companies located on the platform.

Following the incident, Romanian authorities opened an investigation to determine the circumstances surrounding the fire. The investigation was led by DIICOT, with intelligence support from the SRI.

== Criminal investigation ==
On 26 October 2026, DIICOT and SRI disclosed information regarding the involvement of a sabotage network in causing the fire. According to DIICOT, evidence gathered pointed to the involvement of three foreign nationals: two Belarusians and one Ukrainian.

Judges of rights and liberties at the Bucharest Court of Appeal issued European Arrest Warrants in absentia for the three suspects. Two of them were located and remanded in custody in Germany, where investigators claimed they were preparing to commit similar acts. The third suspect was located in Poland, and a European Arrest Warrant was issued for him on 26 October.

Romanian authorities initiated extradition proceedings to bring the suspects to Romania. The investigation continued under the charge of attempted acts of diversion. According to DIICOT, the individuals under investigation had also targeted other sites in Romania and other European Union member states.

== Alleged coordination from Russia ==
In the press release issued on 26 October 2026, the SRI attributed the coordination of the network to individuals located in the Russian Federation. The intelligence agency noted that the operations under investigation were not limited to Romanian territory, also targeting arms production facilities, military targets, and other industrial infrastructure in the region.

The SRI framed the incident as part of a broader campaign of sabotage operations attributed to the Russian Federation across Europe. According to the agency, investigations in 2026 identified other attempted actions targeting sites in Romania, including international military facilities and infrastructure used for training the Ukrainian armed forces.

The investigation involved cooperation between Romanian authorities and partner institutions from other European states. As of 26 October 2026, judicial procedures and background checks concerning the individuals involved were ongoing.

== Official reactions ==
- Romania: On 27 October 2026, the President of Romania, Nicușor Dan, condemned the involvement of the Russian Federation in acts of sabotage on Romanian territory, calling such actions a grave violation of the country's sovereignty. The Ministry of Foreign Affairs also reacted to the information presented by the SRI, referring to the threat posed by hybrid attacks. The SRI announced that checks would continue in cooperation with DIICOT, the Ministry of National Defence (through the General Directorate for Defence Intelligence), and the Ministry of Internal Affairs.
- Other domestic reactions: The Alliance for the Union of Romanians (AUR) party strongly condemned Russia's attacks and demanded security assessments and measures for strategic industrial and military facilities. Retired General Virgil Bălăceanu emphasized the need for rapid amendments to the Penal Code. Analyst Remus Ștefureac argued that these tactics trace back to the Soviet Union: "... active measures are a concept from hybrid warfare and espionage doctrine (inherited from the Soviet era and heavily used by Russian secret services) ...".
- Russia: The Embassy of the Russian Federation in Romania rejected the allegations, claiming that Romanian authorities had failed to present evidence of Moscow's involvement. Ambassador Lipaev called the accusations "slanderous insinuations" and denied that Russia organized or coordinated acts of sabotage on Romanian territory or in other states. The ambassador counter-accused Ukrainian authorities of actions threatening regional security and navigation in the Black Sea, without providing evidence regarding Ukrainian involvement in the Carfil fire.
- Other international reactions: Over 40 states expressed solidarity after Romania referred the matter to the Organization for Security and Co-operation in Europe (OSCE).

== See also ==
- Russian hybrid warfare
- Russian sabotage operations in Europe
- 2022 DDoS attacks on Romania
- 2024 incendiary incidents in Europe
- Romania–Russia relations
