= 2024 incendiary incidents in Europe =

- Part of Russo-Ukrainian war and Russian sabotage operations in Europe
- Date: March 20 – July 22, 2024
- Location: Logistics hubs and cargo depots across Europe (Germany, Poland, United Kingdom)
- Type: Incendiary attack, Sabotage, Hybrid Warfare operation
- Motive: To disrupt critical European air cargo and logistics infrastructure
- Suspects: Yaroslav Mikhailov (alleged central coordinator, Russian national)

In various sites in Europe, arson attacks were triggered by incendiary devices in packages. In England, Poland, Latvia, Lithuania and Germany, logistics and commercial facilities were attacked by incendiary devices. Russia is considered the main suspect in the arson attacks across Europe, which authorities consider to be acts of sabotage.

== Attacks ==
=== London, England ===
On 20 March 2024, a fire occurred at warehouse in Leyton, east London. The warehouse was connected to a Ukrainian-owned business. Seven people were subsequently charged with arson and espionage related offences. In October 2024, a man admitted carrying out the arson attack on behalf of Russia. A second man plead guilty to aggravated arson and accepting payment from a foreign intelligence agency in November 2024. A further three men were convicted in July 2025 of aggravated arson with intent to endanger life.

=== Wrocław, Poland ===
At the end of January 2024, a Ukrainian man was arrested by Polish police at a bus station in Wrocław, Poland, for planning to set fire to a nearby paint factory. Documents and videos in his possession connected him to an agent of Russian intelligence.

=== Vilnius, Lithuania ===
On 9 May 2024, a fire broke out in the warehouse of an IKEA store in Vilnius.

=== Birmingham, England ===
On 22 July 2024, a parcel spontaneously caught fire at a DHL warehouse in Minworth near Birmingham. Firefighters and employees were able to put out the fire. The Guardian reported the package was sent by air. Whether it was sent on a cargo or passenger plane and the final delivery location are not known. The Wall Street Journal reported that the devices were "electric massagers implanted with a magnesium-based flammable substance".

=== Leipzig, Germany ===
In July 2024 there was an attack at the DHL freight centre in Leipzig at Leipzig/Halle Airport. A package containing an incendiary device ignited shortly before it was loaded onto the cargo plane. The fire also spread to other packages and eventually engulfed the entire container. The shipment was posted in Vilnius, Lithuania and was supposed to be reloaded in Leipzig. According to German National Secret Service, BfV only the delay of the cargo plane prevented even greater damage.

The media has suspected connections between the incident and the Swiftair Flight 5960 accident.

The German Federal Prosecutor's Office initiated an investigation because there is a suspicion that it was an act of terrorism.

== Investigations ==
Russia is considered the main suspect in the arson attacks across Europe, which national authorities consider to be acts of sabotage.

In May 2024, the Polish Internal Security Agency arrested and charged 9 suspects who "were directly involved in acts of sabotage in Poland, ordered by Russian services", said Prime Minister Donald Tusk. The group is suspected of executing the arson attack at least in Vilnius and Wroclaw.

Polish foreign minister Radosław Sikorski said Russia had planned similar actions across Europe, recruiting saboteurs and paying large sums of money to carry out arson attacks on public infrastructure in Europe.

In November 2024, Poland's National Prosecutor's Office has confirmed four arrests after parcels "containing explosives" were allegedly sent via courier companies to European countries and the UK. The prosecutor said, the group's goal was allegedly "to test the transfer channel for such parcels, which were ultimately to be sent to the United States of America and Canada". The apparent firebomb attack at the DHL warehouse in Birmingham, was believed to be a trial run for a US attack, according to Polish officials. The four people were involved in "sabotage" and "of an international nature were detained".

In August, Germany's Federal Office for the Protection of the Constitution and the Federal Criminal Police Office sent a notice to companies in the aviation and logistics sectors warning of "unconventional incendiary devices" that could be sent by unknown persons via freight service providers. It could be acts of sabotage by Russian agents.

In September 2025, Lithuanian authorities charged 15 people with terrorism charges over their alleged involvement in the attacks.

== See also ==
- 2024 Baltic Sea submarine cable disruptions
- 2024 France railway arson attacks
- 2025 Russian railway sabotage in Poland
- 2026 Carfil sabotage
- Russian hybrid warfare
- Russian sabotage operations in Europe
- Severing of the Svalbard undersea cable
- Violations of non-combatant airspaces during the Russian invasion of Ukraine
