= Visuals (project) =

Ukrainian nonprofit media project for Ukraine issues

- Website: Visuals
- Commercial: No
- Launched: 2015; 11 years ago
- Current status: Online
- Visuals on FacebookVisuals in Wikimedia Commons

Visuals — Ukrainian nonprofit media project for the creation and dissemination infographic on actual for Ukraine issues. It functions as pages in the social networks Twitter and Facebook. In November 2015, Visuals gave permission to publish all their material licensed under the Creative Commons CC-BY-SA-4.0.

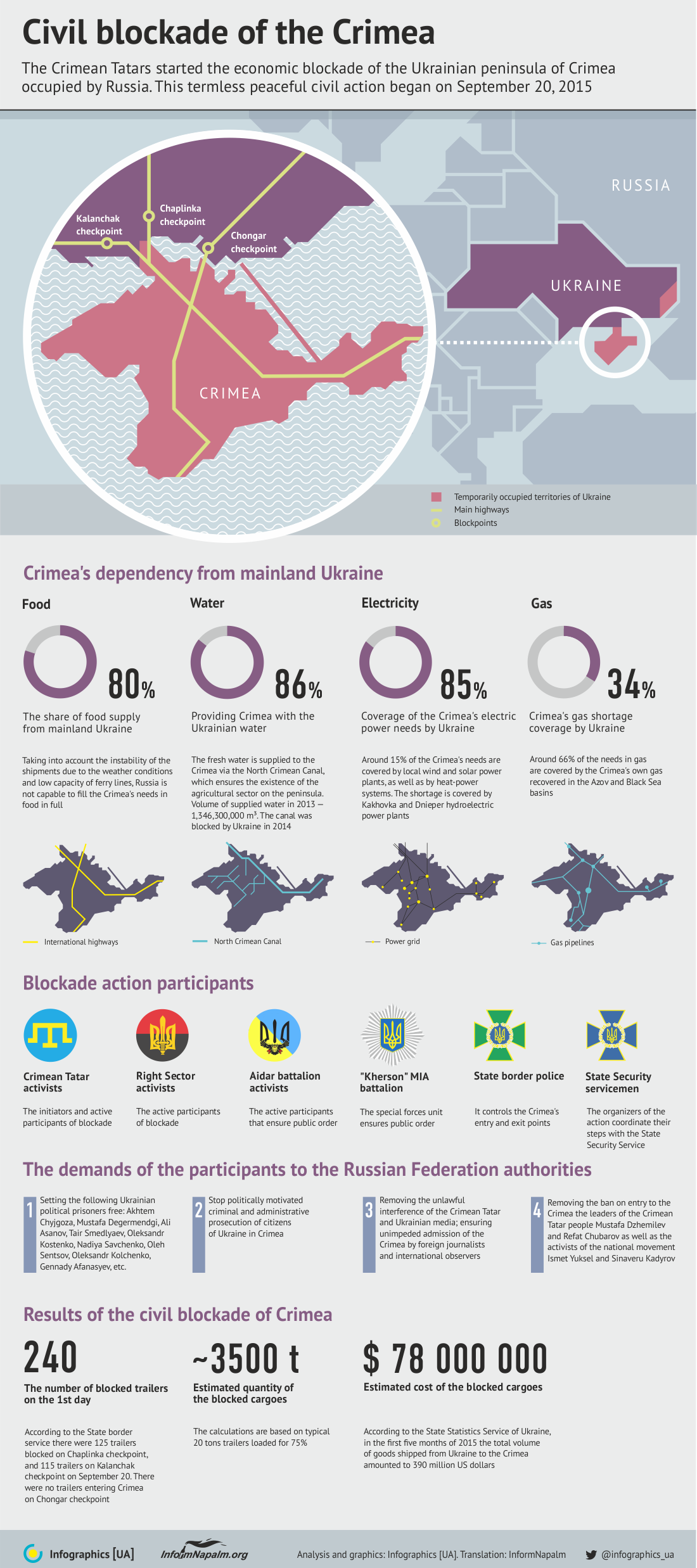
Example of infographics in English. Civile blockade of the Crimea 2015. A Tool of Non-violent Influence on Aggressor.

== Name ==
At first the project was known as «Infographics (UA)». On November 4, 2015, the name changed to «Visuals».

== History ==
The project came in January 2015 at the height of Russia's military aggression against Ukraine. The main topics covered at the project site - the situation in the Eastern Ukraine, annexation of Crimea, the state of implementation of reforms in Ukraine, Ukrainian politics and economics, Russian military intervention in the Syrian Civil War, international policy, resonant events in Ukraine and abroad.

In October 2015 the project started cooperation with the international volunteer group Inform Napalm. The product of this collaboration was the infographics containing personal data of crews of Russian aviation, which bombards the Syrian city.

== See also ==
- Inform Napalm
