= Yuriy Shchyhol =

Ukrainian brigadier general (born 1983)

- Юрій Щиголь
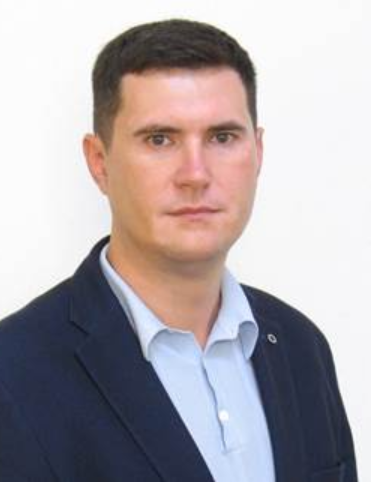

Head of State Special Communications Service of Ukraine
- In office ?–2023

Personal details
- Born: 5 November 1983 (age 42)

Military service
- Rank: Brigadier general
- Battles/wars: Russo-Ukrainian War

Yurii Fedorovych Shchyhol (born 5 November 1983) is a brigadier general, candidate of legal sciences, and the former head of the State Special Communications Service of Ukraine (SSSCIP) (Ukrainian: DerzhSpetsZviazku). He calls the current Russian-Ukrainian cyberwarfare to be the first world cyberwarfare. He also defines Russia as a legal target for Ukraine's cyber attacks. In November 2023, he was removed from his position after he was accused of embezzlement and corruption by NABU special investigators, having allegedly embezzled ₴62 million surrounding the purchase of software for SSSCIP. He was released from detention on bail. More recently, he has been reenlisted into the Ukrainian military for service on the frontlines.

== Biography ==
He was born on 5 November 1983 in the village of Zazymia, Brovary Raion, Kyiv Oblast.

In 2006, he graduated from the National University of the State Tax Service of Ukraine, majoring in law.

In 2017 he finished Alfred Nobel University, majoring in finance and credit.

From 2007 to 2008, he worked in the Baryshivka tax inspectorate of the Kyiv Oblast.

From 2008 to 2009, he studied at the National Academy of the Security Service of Ukraine.

From 2008 to 2020, he served in the military in operational and managerial positions in the Security Service of Ukraine.

On 8 July 2020, by order of the Cabinet of Ministers of Ukraine No. 822-r, he was appointed the Head of the State Service for Special Communications and Information Protection of Ukraine.

Shchyhol also highlighted the importance of Starlinks provided by Elon Musk to Ukraine in renewing the communication to liberated areas of Ukraine from Russian occupiers.
