= IT Army of Ukraine =

Ukrainian cyberwarfare volunteer group

- IT-армія України
- Active: 26 February 2022 – present
- Country: Ukraine
- Branch: Cyberwarfare
- Size: ~1000 Ukrainian and foreign volunteers as of 3 March 2022
- Website: itarmy.com.ua

The IT Army of Ukraine (Ukrainian: IT-армія України) is a volunteer cyber force organisation created at the end of February 2022 to engage in cyberwarfare against Russia during the Russo-Ukrainian war. The group conducts offensive cyberwarfare operations, primarily DDoS attacks, against Russian state organizations and businesses.

== Formation ==
On 26 February 2022, the Minister of Digital Transformation and First Vice Prime Minister of Ukraine, Mykhailo Fedorov, announced the creation of the IT Army, which has been coordinating its efforts primarily via Telegram and Twitter.

According to Reuters, the Ukrainian government asked for volunteers from the country's hacker underground to help protect critical infrastructure and conduct cyber spying missions against Russian troops. Yegor Aushev, the co-founder of a Ukrainian cybersecurity firm Hacken, wrote, "Ukrainian cybercommunity! It's time to get involved in the cyber defense of our country," asking hackers and cybersecurity experts to submit an application listing their specialties, such as malware development, and professional references.

Furthermore, the Ukrainian government broadcast a global call for the participation hackers, hacktivists, and regular computer users alike, the first time a nation-state has done so, thus further shaping cyberwarfare doctrine.

In an interview published by The Record in August 2022, the interviewer stated that the group's main Telegram channel had more than 231,000 followers as of mid-August. An unnamed administrator of the group declined to give membership figures but said it had doubled in size over the previous six months.

== Aims ==
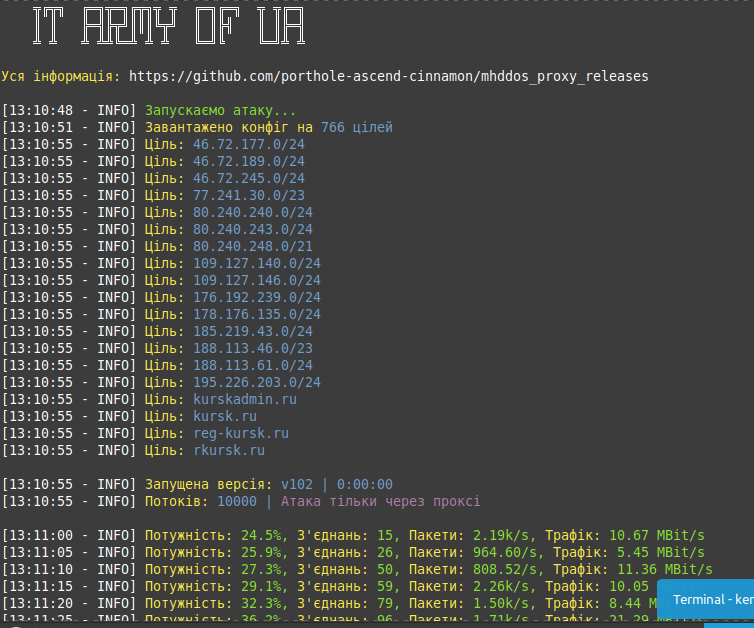
Denial of Service attack

The volunteers who joined the group are divided into offensive and defensive cyber units. While the offensive volunteer unit would assist Ukraine's military in conducting digital espionage operations against invading Russian forces, the defensive unit would be employed to defend infrastructure such as power plants and water systems.

The Ukrainian government used Twitter and Telegram to share a list of Russian and Belarusian targets for the army to attack. As time went on, the dissemination of target information became more structured, with attacks primarily consisting of denial-of-service attacks using a variety of open-source tools. Russian ransomware operators responded by offering their assistance to counter the Ukrainian effort.

== Activities ==
- Fedorov requested the assistance of cyber specialists and tweeted a Telegram with a list of 31 websites of Russian business and state organizations.
- On 28 February 2022, the IT Army hacked the website of the Moscow Stock Exchange. The IT Army posted that it had taken them only five minutes to render the website inaccessible.
- On the same day, the IT Army hacked the website of Sberbank, Russia's largest bank. The IT Army had also launched attacks on other Russian and Belarusian sites, including the government websites of Russia and Belarus, the FSB, and the Belarusian state news agency BelTA, among others.
- According to Reuters, the group targets Russian power grids and railways to prevent Russian infrastructure from reaching Ukraine. This included technologies such as GLONASS.
- Eight hundred Russian websites, including Roscosmos, were attacked by the IT Army from 27 June to 10 July. They posted congratulatory messages to Ukrainian Constitution Day on those websites. Additionally, distributed denial-of-service attacks carried out by the IT army have crippled the Russian ability to work on some CRM systems for extended periods.
- Ukraine's Ministry of Digital Transformation reported that cyberattacks on over 6000 Russian web resources occurred between 26 February and 30 July.
- In September 2022, the group had reportedly collaborated with Anonymous to commit a cyberattack against Yandex Taxi's systems, resulting in a traffic jam in Moscow.
- The group claimed to have successfully hacked the website of the notorious Russian paramilitary group, the Wagner Group, and stolen the personal data of its members. On the defaced website, photos of dead soldiers were shown afterward.
- On 7 October 2022, the IT Army hacked the website of the Collective Security Treaty Organization (CSTO), through which they congratulated the Russian president on his birthday.
- In October 2023, they stated they would abide by the International Committee of the Red Cross rules of engagement for civilian hackers, even if it put them at a disadvantage.
- In late October 2023, the IT Army claimed on Telegram that it had carried out DDoS attacks on three Russian telecommunications providers serving occupied Ukrainian territories: Miranda-Media, Krimtelekom and MirTelekom. The operators confirmed the attacks and reported a temporary loss of service. Miranda-Media said within hours that about 80 percent of services had been restored.
- On 3 August 2025, ten days after the launch of the nuclear submarine Knyaz Pozharsky, Ukrainian hackers obtained numerous classified documents revealing the vessel’s capabilities and limitations and published them in open access.
- IT Army uses Clearview’s facial recognition system to identify the bodies of Russian soldiers killed in combat and to inform their families of their deaths, with the aim of provoking internal unrest in Russia. Surveillance researcher Stephanie Hare describes this activity as psychological warfare and suggests that, conversely, it could strengthen anti-Ukrainian sentiment in Russia.

== See also ==
- Russo-Ukrainian cyberwarfare
- Starlink in the Russo-Ukrainian war, the use of SpaceX's large satellite constellation for warfare and communications in Ukraine
- Russian web brigades
