= InformNapalm =

Citizen journalism web site

- Owner: NGO
- Creators: Roman Burko, Irakli Komaxidze
- Website: InformNapalm.org
- Commercial: No
- Launched: March 29, 2014; 12 years ago
- Current status: Online
- Content license: Creative Commons Attribution License (CC BY 4.0)
- InformNapalm in Wikimedia Commons

InformNapalm is a volunteer initiative to inform Ukrainian citizens and the foreign public about the Russo-Ukrainian War and the activities of the Russian special services as well as the militants of DPR, LPR, and Novorossiya. The team members are engaged in a wide range of other volunteer activities. Authors publish materials in 30 languages, including Japanese and Chinese.

== History ==
The Informnapalm.org website was created on 29 March 2014 after the Russian military intervention in Ukraine and annexation of Crimea. During the existence of the project, volunteers conducted two profound investigations of the shoot-down of Malaysia Airlines Flight 17 and gathered evidence of the presence of Russian troops in Ukrainian territory.

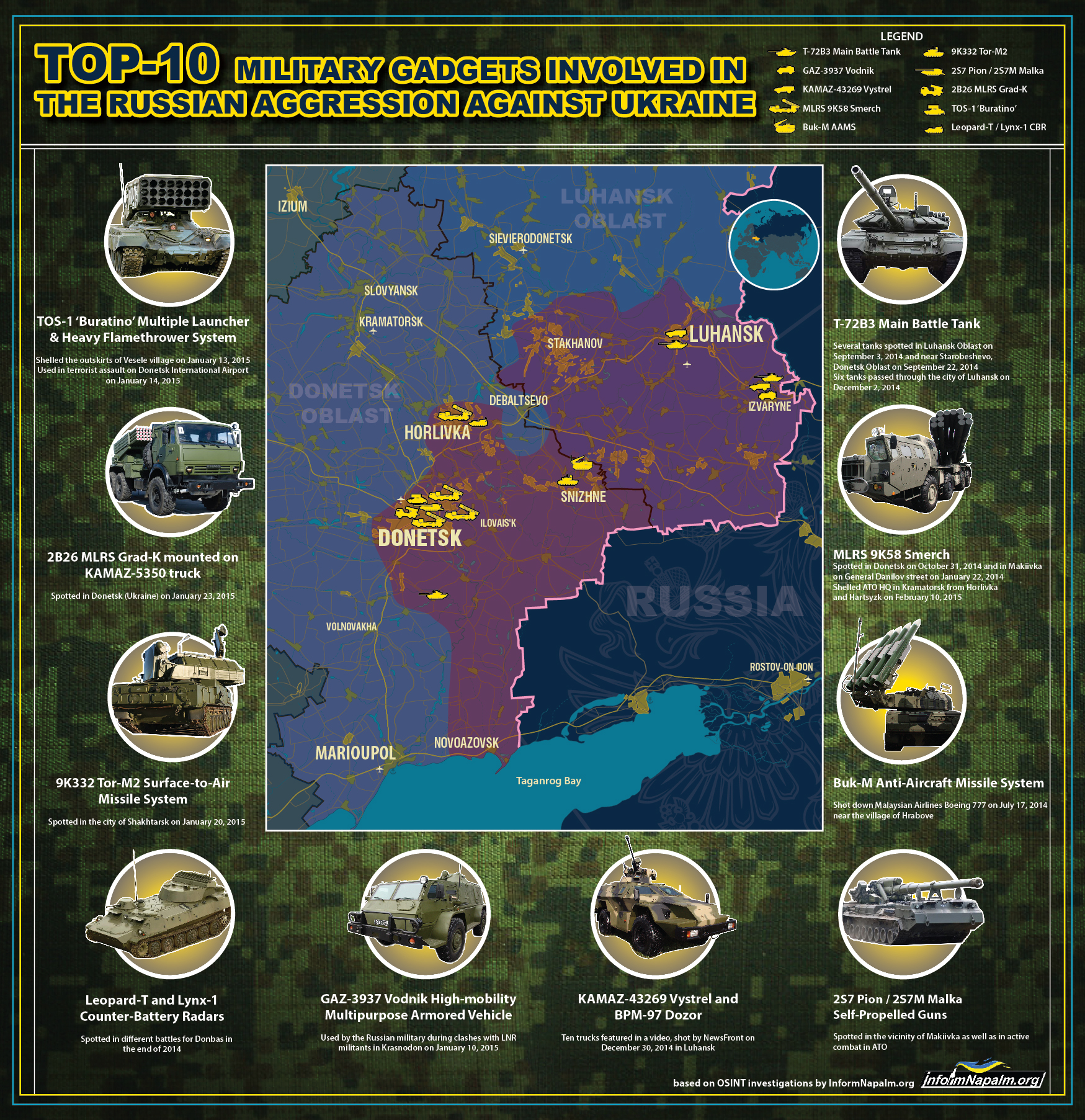
TOP-10 Military Gadgets Involved in the Russian Aggression Against Ukraine. InformNapalm Infographics

The main activities of the project are collecting and analysing OSINT information, found in open sources, including social networks. InformNapalm's investigation of 53rd Anti-Aircraft Missile Brigade commander colonel Sergei Muchkayev, suspected of killing the MH17 passengers, was used in the report of the Bellingcat research team.

After the Russian intervention in Syria, InformNapalm began publishing personal data of Russian pilots who bombed Syrian cities, and together with the media project "Visuals" created infographics containing personal data of crew members. These publications have caused negative reactions in Russia. In particular, the Russian President's press secretary, Dmitry Peskov, has said that in response to the actions of the project "Russian special services will take all necessary measures". In response, the authors of the site said that "every violation the ceasefire in the Donbas by the joint Russian-separatist forces will cause the publication of another OSINT-investigation with names, photos, tactical and registration numbers and other details and facts related to Russian pilots crimes during a military operation in Syria". TV channel Al Arabiya compared this InformNapalm project activity with WikiLeaks publications.

By the end of 2016, the community had 407 investigative publications, 1197 translations and over 3920 reposts in the media.

In March 2017, the Ukraine Crisis Media Center hosted a presentation of the book "Donbas on Fire". The book includes evidence of Russian aggression found and systematized by InformNapalm volunteers.

In April 2018, InformNapalm published an interactive database of Russian aggression. The Russian Aggression database is the result of four years of volunteer work. More than 1700 InformNapalm OSINT investigations are systematized and divided into two groups: Russian weapons found in Donbas; Russian army units that participated in the aggression against Ukraine, Georgia, and Syria. The database is searchable by military unit number and unit name. Images of military unit insignia or military equipment are clickable and lead to a list of investigations.

== Surkov leaks ==
On 23 October 2016, Ukrainian hacker group CyberHunta published correspondence that it alleged was from the office email account of Vladislav Surkov, a political adviser to Vladimir Putin. Volunteers from InformNapalm requested additional evidence from an alliance of hacker groups that includes CyberHunta, RUH8, FalconsFlame, and TRINITY. They secured the release of a 1 GB Microsoft Outlook data file. InformNapalm reported that the hackers also were in possession of documents from 2015 and 2016 that were being analysed by intelligence agencies and were not released due to their operational value.

The document leak included 2,337 emails from Surkov's inbox. The emails illustrate Russian plans to politically destabilize Ukraine and the coordination of affairs with major opposition leaders in separatist Eastern Ukraine. The release included a document sent to Surkov by Denis Pushilin, former Chairman of the People's Council of the Donetsk People's Republic, listing casualties that occurred during 2014. It also included a 22-page outline of "a plan to support nationalist and separatist politicians and to encourage early parliamentary elections in Ukraine, all with the aim of undermining the government in Kyiv."

== Private files of Russian militants ==
Thanks to the cooperation with hackers, InformNapalm volunteers were able to access private files of individual Russian militants. In March 2016, a group of cyber activists FalconsFlame handed over to InformNapalm volunteers data extracted from the phone of Nikolai Reichenau, an employee of the Russian Federal Penitentiary Service: photos of the Russian occupier in the settlements of Luhansk, Izvarine, Sorokine (formerly Krasnodon), Donetsk, Ilovaisk, Bakhmut (formerly Artemivsk), Debaltseve, and Vuhlehirsk. The phone also contained videos and photos from Donetsk airport taken in January 2015. After the article was published, the official YouTube channel of the InformNapalm community received a letter from YouTube management demanding that the video be removed within 48 hours due to a complaint about privacy violations. After a series of consultations, InformNapalm volunteers prepared an open letter to the YouTube editorial board.

== See also ==
- OSINT
