= State Special Communications Service of Ukraine =

Technical security and intelligence service of Ukraine

State Service of Special Communications and Information Protection of Ukraine (SSSCIP)
- Державна служба спеціального зв'язку та захисту інформації України (Держспецзв'язку) / State Service of Special Communications and Information Protection of Ukraine (SSSCIP); State Service of Special Communications and Information Protection of Ukraine (SSSCIP)

Agency overview
- Formed: 1998 (as Department of Special Telecommunication Systems and Information Protection of SBU)
- Preceding agency: SBU
- Jurisdiction: Ukraine
- Headquarters: Kyiv, Ukraine; 50.468963°N 30.466048°E
- Agency executive: Oleksandr Potii, Head of the SSSCIP
- Child agency: Center for Cyber Defense
- Website: Official website

The State Service of Special Communications and Information Protection of Ukraine (Also known as the SSSCIP, Ukrainian: Державна служба спеціального зв'язку та захисту інформації України, romanized: Derzhavna sluzhba spetsial'nogo zv'yazku ta zakhistu informatsiyi Ukrayini, lit. 'State Service for Special Communications and Information Protection of Ukraine'), also known as Derzhspetszv'yazku (Ukrainian: Держспецзв'язку), is a specialized executive authority of which the key functions include the provision of secure government communications, government courier service, information protection and cyber defense.

The SSSCIP provides the country's leadership and core government institutions with reliable and secure communications, in both peacetime and wartime.

== Functions and responsibilities ==
The SSSCIP of Ukraine is responsible for 95 functions & 16 different systems in such spheres.

- information security & cybersecurity
- cryptography, digital signature, and security of electronic trust services
- protection of state information and classified information, CII
- government electronic communication
- state control

The SSSCIP's role in the cybersecurity sphere:

1. Shaping and implementation of the National Cyber Defense Policy

2. Shaping and implementation of the national policy on the protection of governmental information resources in cyberspace

3. Shaping and implementation of the national policy on cyber protection of critical information infrastructure

4. Coordination of cyber defense-related activities by cybersecurity actors

5. Introduction of operational and tactical cyber defense model

6. Taking organizational and technical measures for preventing, identifying of and responding to cyber incidents and cyberattacks as well as the elimination of their consequences

7. Communicating cyber threats and appropriate methods of protection

== Agencies, enterprises and facilities as part of the SSSCIP ==
=== Broadcasting, Radiocommunications & Television Concern ===
The Broadcasting, Radiocommunications & Television Concern (Ukrainian: Концерн радіомовлення, радіозв'язку та телебачення, romanized: Kontsern radiomovlennia, radiozv'iazku ta telebachennia), also known as the BRTC (Ukrainian: КРРТ, romanized: KRRT), is a state-owned TV and radio relay and satellite broadcasting operator. The BRTC's infrastructure includes more than 500 antenna mast structures, more than 12 thousand km of radio relay lines, 2 powerful radio centers, a space communications station (SCS) and 2 earth transmitting stations. The Concern operates more than 400 radio and television transmitting stations.

=== Headquarters and units of the State Courier Service ===
Provide top-level courier and communications services to the President of Ukraine, Chairman of the Verkhovna Rada, Prime Minister of Ukraine, public authorities, local self-government bodies, military administration bodies and other legal entities in accordance with the law.

=== Institute of Special Communications and Information Protection ===
The SSSCIP's educational institution trains specialists in cybersecurity and information security.

=== National Center for Operations and Technology Management of Telecommunications Networks ===
In a time of war, coordinates the activities of mobile carriers and telecommunication providers and assumes administration of their networks.

=== Ukrainian Special Systems state-owned enterprise ===
Ensures confidential communication, creation of comprehensive information protection systems and regulatory examination; provides electronic confidential services and information resources protection services.

=== State Enterprise of Special Communications ===
Provides special communications for the most important national events — elections, nationwide referendums; delivers confidential correspondence and valuable items.

=== Diprozviazok Ukrainian Institute for Engineering and Development of Information and Communications Infrastructure, a private joint stock company ===
Develops the strategy of the unified national communications system and development of communications networks of Ukraine.

=== Ukrainian Scientific and Research Institute of Radio and Television state-owned enterprise ===
Conducts research in the area of telecommunications and radiofrequency resource at the national and international levels. Ukrspetszviazok state-owned enterprise ensures the operation of special-purpose telecommunication nodes.

=== SSSCIP's Volunteer Hub ===
The place where efforts of volunteers are coordinated for the support of servicemen of the SSSCIP, Armed Forces of Ukraine and other forces of the security and defense sectors of Ukraine.

== Long Service Medal ==
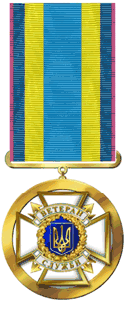
25 years in service

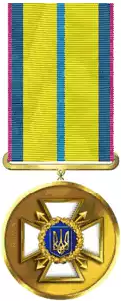
20 years in service

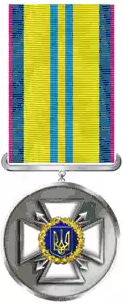
15 years in service

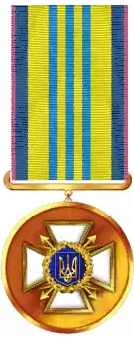
10 years in service

== See also ==
- Telecommunications in Ukraine
- Internet in Ukraine
