= Cyberattacks on Ukraine =

Cyberattacks on Ukraine may refer to:

- 2015 Ukraine power grid hack, which caused outages
- 2016 Kyiv cyberattack, which caused another power outage
- 2017 Ukraine ransomware attacks
- 2022 Ukraine cyberattacks

== See also ==
- Ukraine power grid hack (disambiguation)
