= Nivelir =

Series of Russian military satellites

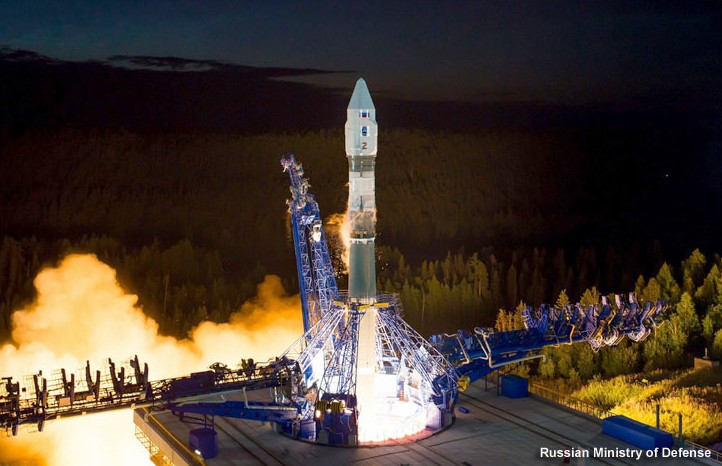
- Launch of Kosmos–2558 on August 1, 2022.
- Manufacturer: TsNIIKhM
- Country of origin: Russia
- Operator: Russian Aerospace Forces

Specifications
- Spacecraft type: Anti-satellite weapon, reconnaissance satellite
- Bus: Lavochkin 14F150
- Equipment: Fakel K50-10.6 hydrazine monopropellant thrusters; Lepton hyperspectral imager; Optika panchromatic sensor

Production
- Status: Active
- Launched: 6+
- Operational: 30 September 2011
- Maiden launch: 25 December 2013, 00:31 UTC; Plesetsk LC 133/3
- Last launch: 23 May 2025, 08:36 UTC; Plesetsk LC 43/4

Related spacecraft
- Subsatellites: Inspector containing one or more kinetic kill vehicles
- Launch vehicle: Soyuz 2.1b/Fregat; Soyuz 2.1v/Volga; Rokot/Briz-KM

Nivelir (Russian: Нивелир; "dumpy level"; Project 14K167) is a class of Russian military low Earth orbit (LEO) satellites widely believed to be co-orbital anti-satellite weapons (ASAT) with secondary space surveillance missions. The spacecraft are often compared to Matryoshka "nesting dolls", as each contain a smaller inspector subsatellite, which can themselves deploy one or more kinetic kill vehicles (KKV).

Nivelir spacecraft are inserted into coplanar orbits with target satellites, launching just as the target passes over the launch site. After reaching orbit, the spacecraft shadow their target in a practice termed "space stalking." After closing the distance with their target, they perform rendezvous and proximity operations (RPO) and mock kinetic attacks. To date, Nivelir launches have primarily targeted satellites owned by the United States. The spacecraft's secondary reconnaissance mission leverages its hyperspectral and panchromatic imaging payload and reconfigures the sensors from imaging objects on orbit to enable earth observation missions.

Designed and built by the Russian Central Scientific Research Institute of Chemistry and Mechanics (TsNIIKhM) on a Lavochkin 14F150 bus, the first Nivelir was launched on December 25, 2013, aboard a Rokot/Briz-KM carrier rocket, though subsequent launches have utilized the Soyuz 2.1b and 2.1v platforms. All launches have taken place at Plesetsk Cosmodrome in northwest Russia, with the most recent launch occurring in May 2025. The satellites are operated by the Russian Aerospace Forces from the 1009/5 mission control center in Noginsk-9, east of Moscow.

== Project history ==
Nivelir is Russian for "dumpy level" or "surveyor", a type of optical measuring instrument. The Nivelir project began September 30, 2011, when a contract for the program was awarded to the Central Scientific Research Institute of Chemistry and Mechanics (TsNIIKhM) by the State Scientific and Technical Center Garant (GNTTs Garant), an enigmatic office under the Ministry of Economic Development.

The first Nivelir spacecraft was launched as an apparent Christmas surprise as Kosmos-2491 on December 25, 2013, at 00:31 UTC. The spacecraft, designated Cosmos-2491, was launched from Site 133/3 of the Plesetsk Cosmodrome as a co-passenger on a Rokot/Briz-KM 11A05 booster alongside several communications satellites. Subsequent launches have utilized only the Soyuz 2.1b and 2.1v carrier rocket platforms, all launched from Plesetsk Site 43/4.

== Satellite design ==
Nivelir combines two different satellites: a larger "parent" platform and a smaller "inspector" subsatellite carried within it. The parent satellites are built on the 14F150 series satellite bus developed and manufactured by Lavochkin.

The parent satellites perform orbital changes using a liquid propulsion stage composed of disposable K50-10.6 thermal catalytic hydrazine monopropellant thrusters manufactured by the Fakel design bureau. The thrusters are fed from an eight-liter MVSK84 hydrazine tank manufactured by NIIMash in Nizhnyaya Salda.

The imaging payload onboard the parent satellite includes Lepton's Pribor-GS hyperspectral sensor, and Optika's PKVR 33 cm panchromatic sensor. Publications by Lavochkin and Lepton reveal that the parent satellite's imaging payload functions in two distinct modes. When the hyperspectral imager is conducting Earth observation, it operates in a "time delay integration" mode, capturing a continuous swath of terrain with higher resolution. When configured for space surveillance to observe other satellites, the camera switches to a "staring" or "frame" mode to focus on an individual target.

In November 2016, TsNIIKhM contracted with the Ferrite-Domen Scientific Research Institute to develop a radar-absorbing film of hydrocarbon and ferromagnetic nanoparticles for Nivelir satellites called Nivelir-RP. Efforts to evade radar detection are not found on civilian satellites, but are important features for an ASAT.

=== Inspector subsatellite ===
The much smaller inspector satellites are built by TsNIIKhM and equipped to approach and inspect other satellites from extremely close ranges. For on-orbit navigation and targeting, the subsatellites utilize the "KTZ" computer vision system developed by the State Ryazan Instrument Plant (GRPZ) and laser rangefinders which are functional between 200 meters and 12 kilometers.

== Rendezvous incidents ==
=== Kosmos–2504 and Fengyun–1C ===
Kosmos-2504 was launched on March 31, 2015, along with three Gonets-M communication satellites. The satellite spent its first two years making a series of 11 maneuvers near its Briz-M upper stage. In 2017, it maneuvered to within a kilometer of the debris cloud of Fengyun-1C, a weather satellite destroyed in a 2007 anti-satellite missile test by the Chinese military. In a report from state-run news outlet Interfax, former Roscosmos director Oleg Ostapenko claimed the satellites "are absolutely peaceful vehicles", saying "we know these tall tales about small maneuvering vehicles." John B. Sheldon of the George C. Marshall Institute called its maneuvers "characteristic of orbital anti-satellite weapons."

=== Kosmos–2542 and USA–245 ===
Video of the launch of Kosmos-2542 from Plesetsk, November 25, 2019.

On November 25, 2019, Kosmos-2542 launched into a coplanar orbit trailing USA-245, a likely KH-11 series reconnaissance satellite owned by the U.S. National Reconnaissance Office, closing to within 30 kilometers of the American spacecraft. On December 6, Kosmos-2542 released a sub-satellite, Kosmos-2543, which made multiple passes near USA-245, then backed off and released an object, tentatively identified as Kosmos-2547, at a speed astrophysicist Jonathan McDowell estimated to be 140-180 meters per second. A press release from U.S. Space Command stated that "on July 15, Russia injected a new object into orbit from Cosmos 2543", stating that the speed was fast enough to damage or destroy any target in its sights, and characterizing it as amounting to "a test of an anti-satellite weapon", likely intended as a show of force. On December 9, USA–245 left its orbit in an apparent evasive maneuver to prevent a close encounter with the Kosmos–2543 subsatellite.

Commanding general of the U.S. Space Force general John W. Raymond described the Kosmos-2542 Nivelir satellite as a "nesting doll" with an outer casing that opens up to reveal an inner satellite shell which itself opens to reveal an anti-satellite weapon that can fire at and destroy orbiting satellites from a safe distance. In response to Raymond's comments, the Russian foreign ministry stated: "the movement of our device did not pose a threat to the American space object and, most importantly, did not violate any norms and principles of international law."

=== Kosmos–2558 and USA–326 ===
External image
- Kosmos–2558 viewed on orbit from an HEO Robotics microsatellite.

Just six months after the launch of USA-326, Russia launched Kosmos-2558 into the same sun-synchronous orbit (SSO) with a difference of just 0.04 degrees and a separation of 37 miles (60 kilometers), demonstrating that Russia can select targets and launch a pursuit craft on relatively short notice. Kosmos-2558 continued performing semi-monthly orbit corrections to keep its altitude between 441 and 444 km, apparently to maintain an orbital plane close to that of USA-326. By the middle of March 2023, the Russian satellite closed on the U.S. spacecraft, making periodic close passes. Around March 18, 2023, Kosmos–2558 proceeded to release an object into an orbit close to USA–326, which performed an evasive maneuver. Marco Langbroek, an astronomer and lecturer on space domain awareness at the Delft University of Technology, suggested that the RPO by Kosmos-2558 represented "the positioning of a counterspace capacity (a dormant co-orbital ASAT weapon)"

=== Kosmos–2576 and USA–314 ===
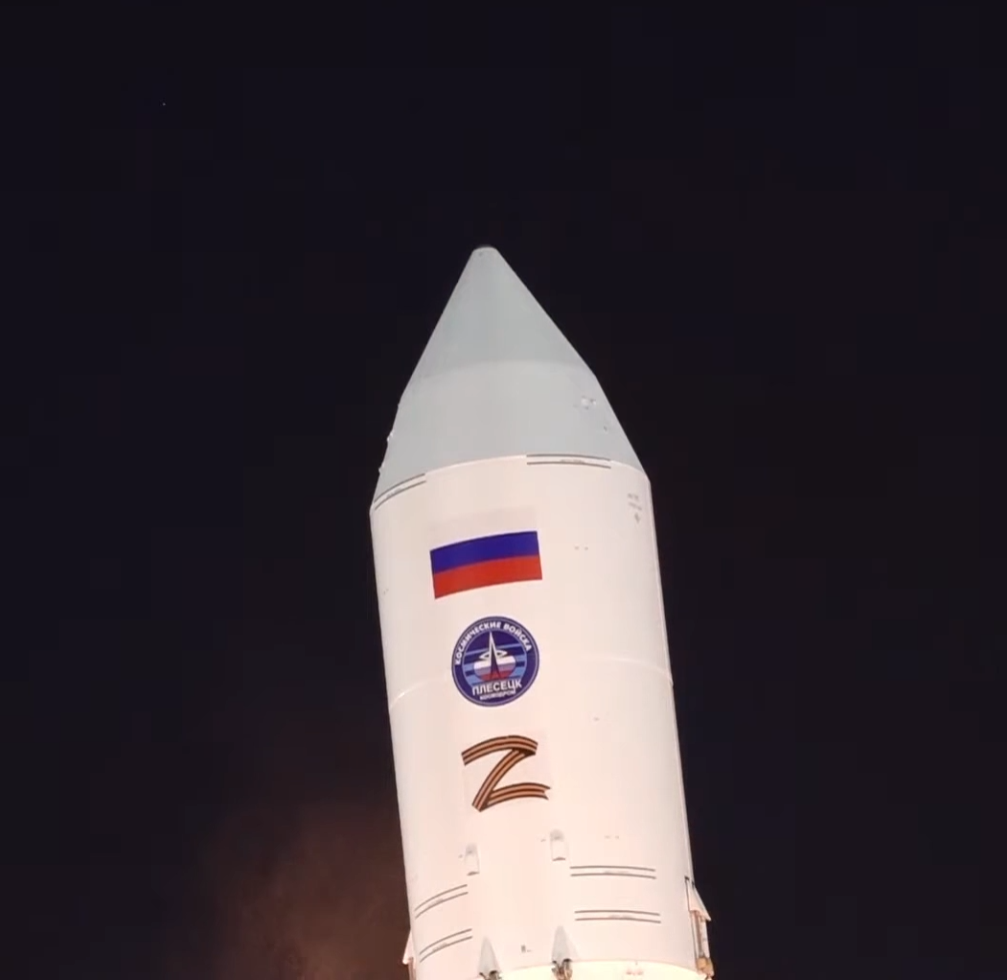
Kosmos-2576 had its payload fairing painted with the Z symbol and Saint George Ribbon colors used in Russia's invasion of Ukraine.

On May 16, 2024, Cosmos–2576 launched into a coplanar orbit with USA–314, a U.S. government satellite. Pentagon officials described Cosmos–2576 as "likely a counter space weapon presumably capable of attacking other satellites in low Earth orbit" and said that the Pentagon's "assessments further indicate characteristics resembling previously deployed counter space payloads, from 2019 and 2022." In remarks during a May 20, 2024 UN Security Council vote on a Russian resolution on space security, U.S. ambassador Robert A. Wood echoed the remarks, adding that "Russia deployed this new counterspace weapon into the same orbit as a U.S. government satellite." The Russian foreign ministry denied the claim stating: "Kosmos 2576 is not an anti-satellite weapon, but part of our normal space operations"

=== Kosmos–2588 and USA–338 ===
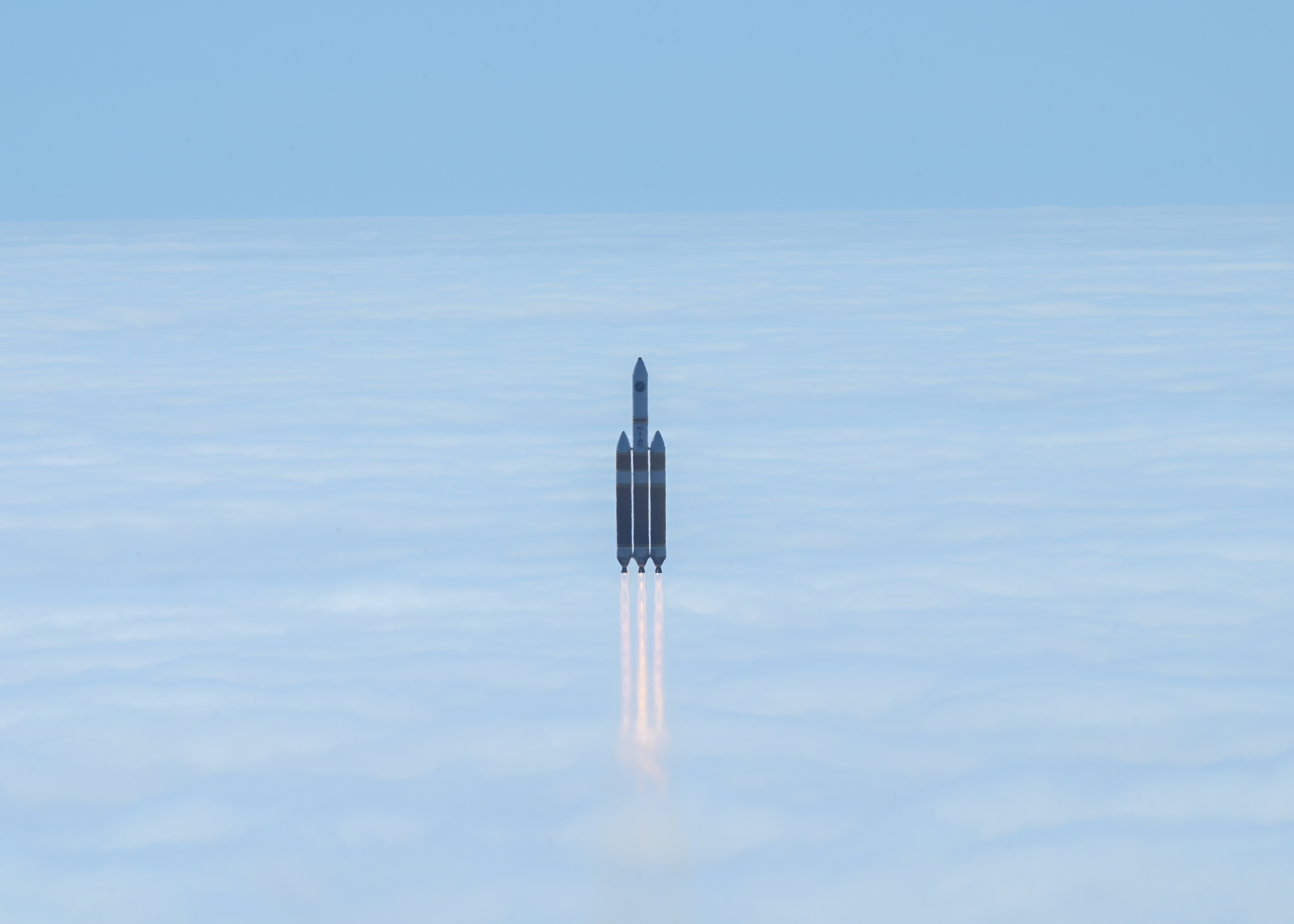
The launch of USA-338 from Vandenberg Space Force Base.

On May 23, 2025, Kosmos-2588 launched into a coplanar orbit with USA-338, a satellite launched a year prior by the U.S. National Reconnaissance Office and widely believed to be an electro-optical reconnaissance satellite. According to US satellite tracking firm Slingshot Aerospace, the point of closest approach (POCA) between the two spacecraft was 93.9 km, with a close approach roughly every 4 days. The company stated that they suspected the craft to have a kinetic weapon on board. A later statement from U.S. Space Command did not name the satellite being shadowed but stated: "U.S. Space Command can confirm Russia’s recent launch put a Russian satellite into an orbit near a U.S. government satellite. Russia continues to research, develop, test, and deploy a range of anti-space systems that threaten the security and stability of space." According to the Russian filing with the United Nations, the satellite was launched "for the solving tasks of the Russian Ministry of Defense."

== Suspected links to Burevestnik ==
Some researchers believe the Nivelir program supports the Project 14K168 Burevestnik (not to be confused with the 9M730 Burevestnik) co-orbital ASAT. The Nivelir program's support is thought to be either as a test program for Burevestnik's RPO capabilities, or to provide operational tracking and targeting support to Burevestnik interceptors.

Both the Nivelir and Burevestnik programs share a joint ground control center named "1009/5" located in the closed city of Noginsk-9, 60 km east of Moscow. Both programs are led by TsNIIKhM, and the spacecraft share the same satellite bus, thermal catalytic thrusters, and fuel tanks. TsNIIKhM has long been associated with ASAT development, having supplied the explosive warhead for the Soviet-era Istrebitel Sputnikov co-orbital ASAT. Mission control for that Soviet ASAT was also located in Noginsk-9, which is home to the 821st Main Space Intelligence Center, the headquarters of Russia's space surveillance network, which provided targeting data for the Soviet ASAT. In 2019, the Russian government sued the contractor for breach of contract over the joint Nivelir-Burevestnik control center.

== Missions ==
Official name	Presumed military index	Launch date	Status	Comments
Kosmos-2491	14F153	2013 Dec 25	in orbit (broken up)	solo mission
Kosmos-2499	14F153	2014 May 23	in orbit (broken up)	RPO* with Briz-KM stage
Kosmos-2504	14F153	2015 Mar 31	in orbit	RPO with Briz-KM stage
Kosmos-2519 Kosmos-2521 Kosmos-2523	14F150 14F162 ?	2017 Jun 23	re-entered re-entered in orbit	coplanar with Kosmos-2486 ejected from Kosmos-2519 ejected from Kosmos-2521
Kosmos-2535 Kosmos-2536**	14F157 14F153	2019 Jul 10	in orbit in orbit	RPO with Kosmos-2536 and 2543 RPO with Kosmos-2535
Kosmos-2542 Kosmos-2543 none***	14F150 14F162 ?	2019 Nov 25	re-entered re-entered in orbit	coplanar with USA-245 ejected from Kosmos-2542 ejected from Kosmos-2543
Kosmos-2558	14F150	2022 Aug 1	in orbit	co-planar with USA-326
Kosmos-2562	14F164 or 14F172	2022 Oct 21	re-entered	RPO with Resurs-P No.3
Kosmos-2571 none****	? ?	2023 Oct 27	in orbit in orbit	ejected from Kosmos-2570 target for Kosmos-2571
Kosmos-2576	14F150	2024 May 16	in orbit	co-planar with USA-314
Kosmos-2581 Kosmos-2582 Kosmos-2583 none*****	? ? ? ?	2025 Feb 5	in orbit in orbit in orbit in orbit	RPO with Kosmos-2582 RPO with Kosmos-2581 passed close to K.-2581/2582 ejected from Kosmos-2583
Citation:
