= ESET =

Slovak internet security company

ESET, spol. s r.o.

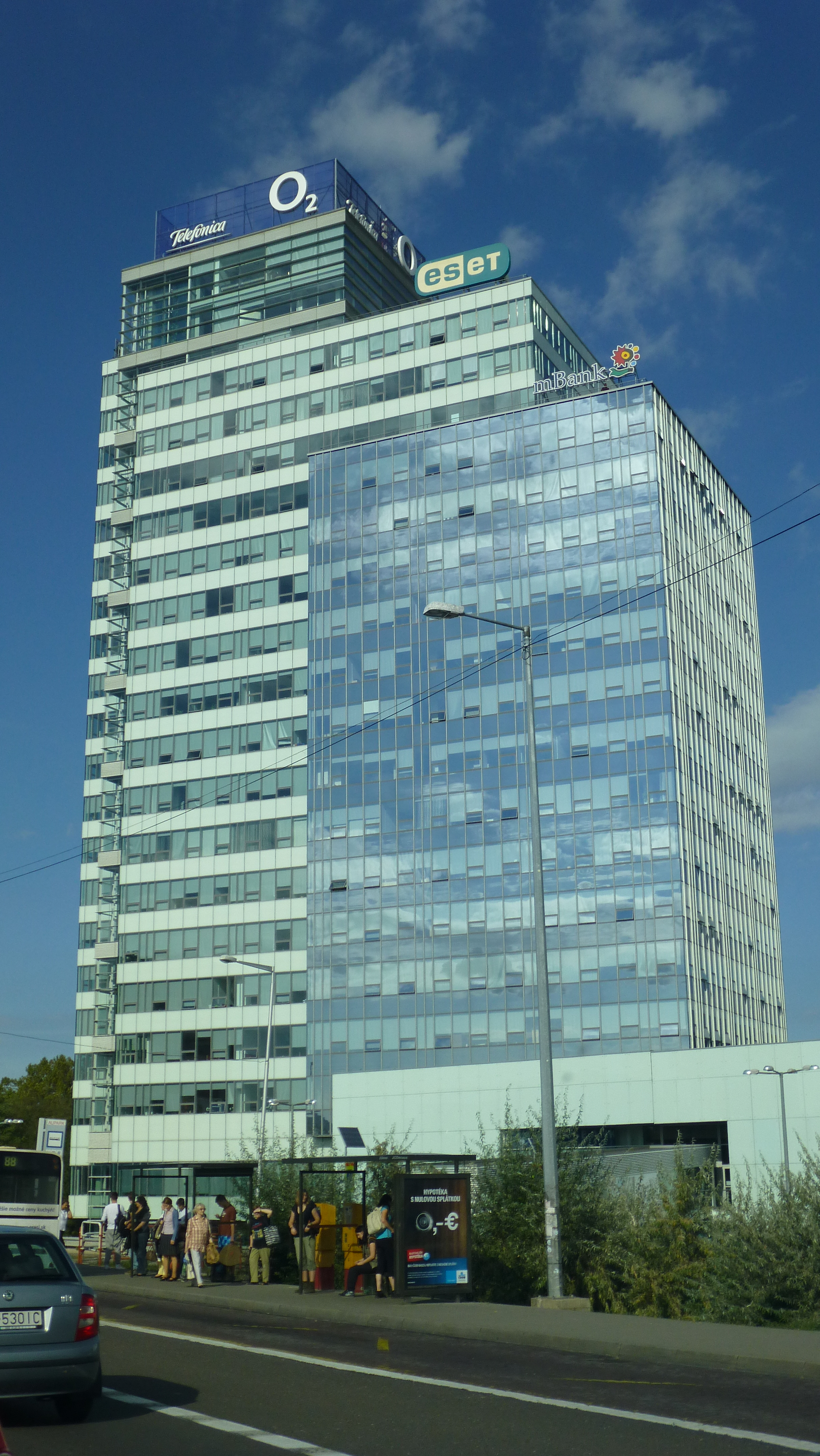
- Company headquarters
- Type: Private limited company
- Industry: Security software
- Founded: 1 January 1992; 34 years ago in Slovakia
- Founder: Rudolf Hrubý; Peter Paško; Miroslav Trnka
- Headquarters: Bratislava, Slovakia
- Area served: Worldwide
- Key people: Miroslav Trnka; Peter Paško; Rudolf Hrubý; Maroš Grund; Anton Zajac; Richard Marko (CEO); Pavol Luka; Juraj Malcho; Martin Balušík
- Products: Products list: ESET Smart Security (Windows); ESET NOD32 Antivirus (Windows, Linux); ESET Cybersecurity (Mac OS X); ESET Mobile Security (Android, Windows Mobile, Symbian); ESET Endpoint Antivirus (Windows); ESET Endpoint Security (Windows); ESET Remote Administrator (Windows, Linux); ESET SysRescue Live; ESET Password Manager
- Revenue: ▲€733 million (2025)
- Net income: 63,897,000 euro (2025)
- Number of employees: ▲2,400+ (2025)
- Divisions: ESET NOD32
- Website: eset.com

ESET is a Slovak cybersecurity company headquartered in Bratislava. Founded in 1992 by Miroslav Trnka, Peter Paško and Rudolf Hrubý, it originated from the NOD antivirus software developed by Trnka and Paško in 1987. The company develops cybersecurity software and services for consumers and organizations, including endpoint security, endpoint detection and response (EDR), extended detection and response (XDR), threat intelligence and managed detection and response (MDR). ESET is privately held and is one of the largest cybersecurity companies headquartered in Europe.

In May 2026, NATO announced a strategic, non-commercial cybersecurity partnership with ESET, Microsoft and Palo Alto Networks aimed at strengthening cyber resilience and cooperation between NATO and the private sector.

== History ==
1987–1992

The product NOD was launched in Czechoslovakia when the country was part of the Soviet Union's sphere of influence. Under the communist regime, private entrepreneurship was banned. It wasn't until 1992 when Miroslav Trnka and Peter Paško, together with Rudolf Hrubý, established ESET as a privately owned limited liability company in the former Czechoslovakia. In parallel with NOD, the company also started developing Perspekt. They adopted the name ESET, from the Slovak name of Isis, the Egyptian goddess of health, marriage and love, as the company name.

2003–2017

In 2013, ESET launched WeLiveSecurity, a blog site dedicated to a vast spectrum of security-related topics.

December 2017 marked the 30th anniversary of the company's first security product. To mark its accomplishments, the company released a short documentary describing the company's evolution from the perspective of founders Miroslav Trnka and Peter Paško. In the same year, the company partnered with Google to integrate its technology into Chrome Cleanup.

2018–present

In December 2018, ESET partnered with No More Ransom, a global initiative that provides victims of ransomware decryption keys, thus removing the pressure to pay attackers. The initiative is supported by Interpol and has been joined by various national police forces. ESET has developed technologies to address the threat of ransomware and has produced papers documenting its evolution.

ESET became a founding member of Google's App Defense Alliance.

Current Management
Position	Management Member
Chief Executive Officer	Richard Marko
Chief Financial Officer	Martin Balušík
Chief Marketing Officer	Mária Trnková
Chief Operating Officer	Palo Luka
Chief Technology Officer	Juraj Malcho
Chief Information Officer	Vladimír Paulen
Chief Sales Officer	Miroslav Mikuš

== Products ==
ESET's first product was NOD, an antivirus program for computers running the MS-DOS operating system. NOD32 1.0 for Microsoft Windows was released in 1998 and version 2.0 in 2003.

ESET NOD32 Antivirus and additional related products with a wider suite of security functions, including ESET Smart Security Premium and ESET Internet Security, are upgraded and released on an annual basis. In 2010, ESET released products for macOS, with a business version now called ESET Endpoint Antivirus and a home version called ESET Cyber Security.

ESET also offers products for Android devices. The first version of ESET Mobile Security was announced in 2012. The product offers malware protection and a call filter, an adware detector, payment protection, and theft protection (such as SIM card locking and total data wipes). In 2015, ESET introduced ESET Parental Control, which allows parents to monitor children's use of Android devices.

ESET Smart TV Security, designed to protect Android TV from malware, phishing, and ransomware, was introduced in 2018 at the Mobile World Congress event in Barcelona.

The company offers products to protect corporate data, ranging from workstation and server protection with ESET PROTECT Entry to endpoint detection and response with ESET Enterprise Inspector.

ESET also offers security products that help companies comply with GDPR requirements. These include ESET Secure Authentication, a two-factor authentication solution introduced in 2015, and ESET Endpoint Encryption, which ESET released in 2017 following the integration of DESlock+ products since 2015. ESET Endpoint Encryption offers file, folder, email, and virtual disk encryption, as well as a desktop shredder for secure file deletion.

== Technology ==
ESET has 11 R&D centres globally and is an operator in the field of malicious code detection. In 1995, ESET introduced heuristic analysis into its detection engine.

ESET has been using machine learning in its products, starting with neural networks, since 1997. In 2005, ESET incorporated a machine learning-based technology called DNA Detections, which extracts selected features – called genes – from samples. These genes split samples into clean, malicious and potentially unwanted categories. In 2019, ESET released an Advanced Machine Learning detection layer that can analyze samples locally on endpoints even when offline.

In 2011, ESET replaced ThreatSense.NET with ESET LiveGrid^{®}, a cloud-based reputation system that evaluates unknown or suspicious samples submitted anonymously by millions of ESET-protected endpoints from around the world for machine learning analysis on servers in Bratislava.

ESET also uses additional security layers including Botnet Protection, Network Attack Protection, Script-Based Attacks Protection, and Brute-Force Attack Protection.

In 2017, ESET became the first security company in the world to implement a UEFI Scanner. UEFI is a firmware that is loaded into a computer's memory during the startup process. The scanner can identify threats while the computer is booting up, before standard detection modules start running.

== Malware research ==
ESET dedicates part of its operations to malware research, as well as to the monitoring of advanced persistent threat groups and other cybercriminal groups, with 40% of the company's employees working in research.

One of the groups that ESET tracked is Sandworm. After the 2015 attack on the Ukrainian power grid and the global NotPetya ransomware attack in 2017 – both attributed to Sandworm – ESET discovered Sandworm (more specifically, a subgroup that ESET tracks as TeleBots) deploying a new backdoor called Exaramel, which is a version of the main Industroyer backdoor. As Industroyer was used in the 2016 blackout in Ukraine, ESET linked Industroyer to NotPetya, as well as to BlackEnergy, which was used in the 2015 blackout.

At the time of the NotPetya outbreak, ESET and Cisco tracked down the point from which the global ransomware attack had started to companies afflicted with a TeleBots backdoor, resulting from the compromise of M.E.Doc, a popular financial software in Ukraine.

In addition, ESET found that multiple threat actors had access to the details of the vulnerabilities even before the release of the patches. Except for DLTMiner, which is linked to a known cryptomining campaign, all of these threat actors are APT groups interested in espionage: Tick, LuckyMouse, Calypso, Websiic, Winnti Group, Tonto Team, ShadowPad activity, The "Opera" Cobalt Strike, IIS backdoors, Mikroceen, DLTMiner, and FamousSparrow.

In the area of IoT research, ESET discovered the KrØØk vulnerability (CVE-2019-15126) in Broadcom and Cypress Wi-Fi chips, which allows WPA2-encrypted traffic to be encrypted with an all zero session key following a Wi-Fi disassociation. Then ESET discovered another KrØØk related vulnerability (CVE-2020-3702) in chips by Qualcomm and MediaTek, as well as in the Microsoft Azure Sphere development kit, with the main difference being that the traffic is not encrypted at all.

Other notable research includes the discovery of LoJax, the first UEFI rootkit found in the wild, which was used in a campaign by the Sednit (aka Fancy Bear) APT group. LoJax is written to a system's SPI flash memory from where it is able to survive an OS reinstall and a hard disk replacement. LoJax can drop and execute malware on disk during the boot process. In 2021, ESET discovered another UEFI malware called ESPecter, which is the second real-world bootkit after FinSpy known to persist on the EFI System Partition in the form of a patched Windows Boot Manager.

In 2021, ESET released the white paper Anatomy of native IIS malware, which analyzed over 80 unique samples of malicious native extensions for Internet Information Services (IIS) web server software used in the wild and categorized these into 14 malware families — 10 of which were previously undocumented.

Among these families, IIS malware demonstrated five main modes of operation:

- IIS backdoors, which can remotely control compromised computers;
- IIS infostealers, which steal information such as login credentials and payment information;
- IIS injectors, which modify HTTP responses sent to legitimate visitors to serve malicious content;
- IIS proxies, which use the compromised server as unwitting parts of the command and control infrastructure for another malware family; and
- SEO fraud IIS malware, which modifies the content served to search engines.

ESET also works alongside experts from competitors and police organizations all over the world to investigate attacks. In 2018, ESET partnered with the European Cybercrime Centre — a specialist Europol team that investigates cybercrime — as a member of its Advisory Group on Internet Security. ESET partnered with law enforcement agencies worldwide and Microsoft to target the Dorkbot botnet in 2015 and the Gamarue (aka Andromeda) botnet in 2017. Then in 2020, ESET partnered with Microsoft, Lumen's Black Lotus Labs, and NTT Ltd. in an attempt to disrupt Trickbot, another botnet.

== See also ==
- Antivirus software
