= Kosmos 2499 =

Russian satellite (2014–2023)

- Operator: Russian Aerospace Forces
- COSPAR ID: 2014-028E
- SATCAT no.: 39765

Spacecraft properties
- Spacecraft type: Nivelir No. 2
- Bus: Lavochkin 14F153
- Manufacturer: TsNIIKhM
- Launch mass: ~50 kg (110 lb)

Start of mission
- Launch date: 23 May 2014, 05:27:54 UTC
- Rocket: Rokot/Briz-KM
- Launch site: Plesetsk 133/3
- Contractor: Roscosmos

End of mission
- Destroyed: January 4 2023, 03:57 UTC

Orbital parameters
- Reference system: Geocentric
- Regime: Low Earth
- Perigee altitude: 1,156 kilometres (718 mi)
- Apogee altitude: 1,512 kilometres (940 mi)
- Inclination: 82.44 degrees
- Period: 112.19 minutes
- Epoch: 25 January 2015, 03:55:30 UTC

Kosmos 2499 was a Russian Nivelir-series satellite operated by the Russian Aerospace Forces in low Earth orbit (LEO) from its launch on May 23, 2014, to its breakup on January 4, 2023. It was speculated to be an experimental orbital anti-satellite weapon (ASAT).

== Mission ==
The satellite was launched on May 23, 2014, from Plesetsk, Russia on a Rokot/Briz-KM launch vehicle along with 3 Rodnik-S satellites. Following launch the spacecraft was provisionally described by the NASA Orbital Debris Program Office as Object E until its identity was confirmed. USSPACECOM tracked it under satellite catalog number 39765.

Some reports have speculated, based on its unusual powered maneuvers, that it may be an experimental anti-satellite weapon, satellite maintenance vehicle, or collector of space debris. Chatham House research director and space security expert Patricia Lewis stated that "whatever it is, [Object 2014-028E] looks experimental."

According to an article published on the official Moscow Institute of Physics and Technology website, congratulating the developers on the successful launch and deployment, the satellite is designed to test experimental plasma propulsion engines/ion thrusters, designed by the JSC Reshetnev Company and the Keldysh Research Center. The article states that the engines are part of a new generation of Hall effect thrusters and are designed to be able to shift a spacecraft on an east-west and north-south axis using a fraction of the energy required by current propulsion systems.

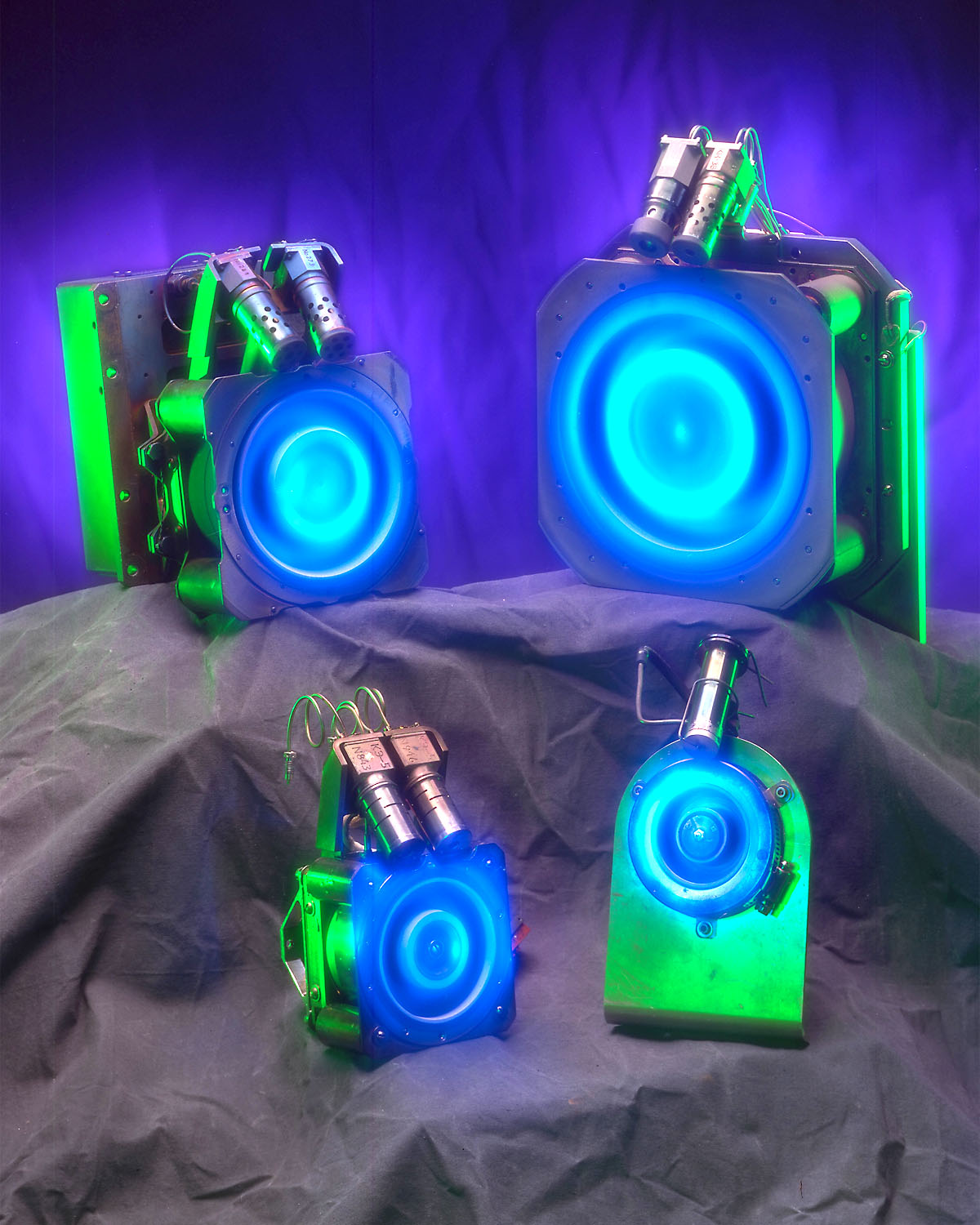
Russian Stationary Plasma Thrusters

== Post-mission ==
In December 2021 USSPACECOM catalogued 18 debris associated with Kosmos 2499.

On February 6, 2023, US Space Command confirmed that the breakup of Kosmos 2499 had occurred on January 4, 2023, at 03:57 UTC. They catalogued 85 associated pieces, orbiting at 1,169 kilometres (726 mi) altitude.

== See also ==
- 2014 in spaceflight
- Cold War II
- Istrebitel Sputnikov
- X-37B
