= Ukraine power grid hack =

Ukraine power grid hack may refer to:

- 2015 Ukraine power grid hack
- 2016 Kyiv cyberattack

== See also ==
- Cyberattacks on Ukraine (disambiguation)
