= Panda Security =

Spanish cybersecurity software company

Panda Security SL
- Type: Private
- Industry: Computer software
- Founded: 9 September 1990
- Headquarters: Bilbao and Madrid, Spain
- Products: Cybersecurity software
- Services: Computer security
- Parent: WatchGuard
- Website: PandaSecurity.com

Panda Security is a Spanish cybersecurity software company. Panda Security's core offering is antivirus software and other cybersecurity software. This includes security products and services for both businesses and home users, as well as protection tools for systems, networks, emails, and other private information. In 2015, the firm was the tenth largest antivirus vendor worldwide, with 2.0% of the marketplace. As of August 2024, Panda Security reports over 600 employees.

== Overview ==
In 2005, Panda Security was the fourth largest antivirus vendor worldwide, with 3.2% of the marketplace. In November 2015, OPSWAT measured Panda Security's market share to be 3.6%. The company, whose shares were previously 100% held by Mikel Urizarbarrena, announced on April 24, 2007, the sale of 75% of its shares to the Southern European investment group Investindustrial and private equity firm Gala Capital. On 30 July 2007, the company changed its name from Panda Software to Panda Security and Urizarbarrena was replaced by Jorge Dinares. Almost one year later, on 3 June 2008, amidst flagging sales, the board of directors voted to replace Dinares with Juan Santana, the CEO. Santana resigned in September 2011 and was replaced by José Sancho as acting CEO. In February 2018, Juan Santamaría was appointed CEO of Panda Security after serving as General Manager.

The firm reportedly operates subsidiaries in several countries like Italy, Switzerland, Germany, Austria, Belgium, the Netherlands, France, the UK, Sweden, Finland, Spain, and Japan. Additionally, it has franchises in another 44 countries. The US subsidiary moved its headquarters to Orlando, Florida in 2009.

In late 2009, Panda Security created a partnership with Web of Trust to help fight the war on viruses.

Panda was previously embroiled in a lawsuit with one of its channel partners, External Technologies, Inc. In 2013, Panda prevailed in this lawsuit, recovering a judgment in excess of $100,000 and prevailing on all claims asserted by External against Panda. On 3 August 2010, a new office location in Menlo Park, California was publicly announced by Panda's CEO via his Twitter account.

In 2012, the firm was the tenth largest antivirus vendor worldwide, with 2.0% of the marketplace.

In March 2020, the Seattle-based network security firm WatchGuard announced that they entered into an agreement to acquire Panda Security.

== See also ==
- Antivirus software
- Internet security
- Panda Cloud Antivirus
