= Rudolf Hrubý =

Slovak businessman and investor (1954–2023)

- Born: 14 April 1954; Dubnica nad Váhom, Czechoslovakia
- Died: 14 December 2023 (aged 69)
- Education: Comenius University
- Occupations: Investor & businessman
- Known for: Co-Founder and CFO of ESET (1992–2010); Owner of HC Slovan Bratislava (since 2020)

Rudolf Hrubý (14 April 1954 – 14 December 2023) was a Slovak businessman and investor. He was a co-founder and long-term CFO of the software company ESET.

== Biography ==
=== Early life ===
Rudolf Hrubý was born on 14 April 1954 in Dubnica nad Váhom. He studied theoretical cybernetics at the Comenius University. Following graduation, he started a company developing accounting software. In 1992 he was invited by Miroslav Trnka and Peter Paško, the owners of IT security start up ESET to join their company as a partner.

=== ESET ===
From 1992 to 2010 Hrubý was a member of top management of ESET, acting as the CFO. In 2010 he departed the management along with the other co-founders, but retained his 22 per cent share in the company. In an Forbes interview, Hrubý explained that coming from an IT background, he struggled to understand finance matters at first, but benefited from his experience in developing accounting software to understand the economic aspects of running a business.

=== After ESET ===
Following his exit from the active management of ESET, Hrubý became involved in various business endeavors. He developed several residence properties in and around his hometown.

In 2014 he, along with the other ESET co-founders, invested €1.2 million as a seed funding for the Denník N daily. Subsequently, he was a member of the supervisory board of the newspaper.

In 2016, Kusý and his fellow former ESET board member, Maroš Grund, bought the Carlton Hotel in central Bratislava for € 600 million in a joint venture with the property developer Erik Mikurčík. The unsuccessful venture resulted in a lengthy legal battle with Mikurčík.

In 2020 Hrubý became the owner of the ice hockey team HC Slovan Bratislava. As the owner of the legendary sports club, he received praise for solving the club's financial problems but was also criticized for poor performances of the club and his opposition to sidelining Russian athletes after the Russian invasion of Ukraine.

In addition, Hrubý also sponsored athletics and car racing competitions. He was a co-owner of the Slovakia Ring racing course.

In 2022, Hrubý donated over € 100,000 eur to Christian Democratic Movement. The party's leader Milan Majerský later admitted the money were donated to support the unsuccessful run of Rudolf Kusý for the Bratislava city major, prompting criticism by the NGOs of lack of transparency of Hrubý's political donations. Hrubý rejected that his donation was intended as funding for Kusý's campaign. ESET's spokesman later issued a statement distancing the company from the conduct of Hrubý.

== Wealth ==
According to Forbes, Hrubý was the 6th Richest Slovak in 2022 with net worth of €750 million.

== Death ==
Hrubý died of a stroke on 14 December 2023, at the age of 69.
