= Cisco Talos =

American cybersecurity company

- Type: Public Company
- Industry: Computer and Network Security
- Headquarters: Fulton, Maryland
- Parent: Cisco Systems, Inc.
- Website: https://talosintelligence.com/

Cisco Talos (Talos), or Cisco Talos Threat Intelligence Group, is a cybersecurity threat intelligence team that operates as part of Cisco Systems, Inc., and is based in Fulton, Maryland. Talos provides threat intelligence that supports Cisco Security products and services, such as malware detection, DNS security, and email filtering. The group partners with industry and government entities to prevent cybersecurity threats. The group also maintains several open-source security tools, including the Snort intrusion prevention system and the ClamAV antivirus engine.

The company is known for its involvement in several high-profile cybersecurity investigations.

== History ==
Sourcefire was founded in 2007 by Martin Roesch, the creator of the Snort intrusion prevention system. Sourcefire created an original commercial version of Snort known as the "Sourcefire 3D System," which eventually became the Firepower line of network security products. The company's headquarters were in Columbia, Maryland in the United States, with offices across the globe.

On July 23, 2013, Cisco Systems announced a definitive agreement to acquire Sourcefire for $2.7 billion. After Cisco's acquisition of Sourcefire, the company combined the Sourcefire Vulnerability Research Team (Sourcefire VRT), Cisco's Threat Research, Analysis, and Communications (TRAC) team, and Security Applications (SecApps) to form Cisco Talos in August 2014. Today, Talos sits under the Cisco Secure umbrella and operates the Cisco Talos Incident Response (Talos IR) team.

In 2014, Cisco Talos helped co-found the Cyber Threat Alliance, a not-for-profit organization with the goal of improving cybersecurity "for the greater good" by encouraging collaboration between cybersecurity organizations by sharing cyber threat intelligence amongst members. As of 2022, the organization reported more than 40 members, including Fortinet, Checkpoint, Palo Alto Networks and Symantec.

In June 2017, the team "SOLAT in the SWEN" from Talos placed first in the inaugural Fake News Challenge (FNC-1), a competition aimed at developing tools to automatically detect the stance of news articles relative to headlines using artificial intelligence and machine learning techniques. Out of 80 registered teams and 50 submitted entries, the winning Talos team used a hybrid approach leveraging deep convolutional neural networks, pre-trained word vectors, and gradient-boosted decision trees, achieving a relative score of 82.02%.

In 2019, Cisco Security Incident Response Services group announced a new partnership with Talos, becoming Cisco Talos Incident Response (Talos IR). Since the creation of Talos IR, the group was named as a leader by IDC in the 2021 MarketScape for Worldwide Incident Readiness Services (doc #US46741420, November 2021). Talos IR was also added to the approved vendor list on the Bundesamt für Sicherheit in der Informationstechnik (BSI) Advanced Persistent Threat (APT) response service providers list in May 2022.

In January 2021, Talos launched Snort3, designed to make the software easier to use.

In July 2023, Cisco and Talos helped to launch the Network Resilience Coalition, a group of technology companies working to ensure users and companies upgrade and update their network infrastructure. The effort was launched after the discovery of JaguarTooth, a massive campaign targeting unpatched wireless routers.

== Threat research and protection ==
Talos regularly collects data on the latest cybersecurity threats, malware, and threat actors through several avenues. That information then powers Cisco Secure's products, including Cisco Secure Cloud and Cisco Secure Endpoint.

The FBI and U.S. Cybersecurity and Infrastructure Security Agency has credited Talos with several major security research breakthroughs, including the VPNFilter malware that could take over home wireless routers, the BlackCat ransomware group, the active exploitation of the PrintNightmare vulnerability in Microsoft Windows and the router malware, a cousin of VPNFilter.

In 2017, Talos discovered a malware known as Nyetya (or "NotPetya") disguising itself as an update for the Ukrainian tax software MeDoc. Nyetya was originally believed to be a ransomware attack targeting multinational corporations. But Talos was amongst the first threat research groups to discover that the attack was deliberately designed to destroy data and target Ukraine.

In May 2018, Talos worked with the FBI in the U.S. to disclose the existence of a widespread wireless router malware known as VPNFilter. At the time of their initial disclosure, Talos stated that as many as 500,000 networking devices, mainly consumer-grade internet routers, were already infected with the malware across 54 countries. VPNFilter essentially acted as a "kill switch" the threat actor could pull at any time to render the device useless. The FBI would go on to release a warning telling users of the affected routers to factory reset their devices to protect against the malware. American law enforcement agencies would eventually go on to seize the botnet associated with VPNFilter and even backdoored some consumer routers. A variant of VPNFilter known as Cyclops Blink would arise again in 2022 in Ukraine after Russia's invasion.

In early 2018, Talos responded to a major cyber attack against the Winter Olympics in Pyeongchang, South Korea. Eventually dubbed "Olympic Destroyer," Talos found the actors wanted to completely wipe computers used on-site for the opening ceremony, rendering them unusable. The cyber attack disrupted the Olympics' official website the day before the opening ceremony, and attendees were unable to access the site or print their tickets to attend the Olympic events. The Wi-Fi in Pyeonchang Olympic Stadium also stopped working for several hours before returning to normal. Although many media outlets reported the attack came from a Russian threat actor, Talos stated there was too much doubt surrounding this assertion to attribute the attack confidently. Talos has since gone on to work on Olympic cybersecurity at other Games.

Since 2021, Cisco has served as the NFL’s Official Enterprise Networking Partner and an Official Cybersecurity Partner. Talos has provided cybersecurity support for several Super Bowls and NFL international games.

Starting in 2022, Talos has been heavily involved in protecting Ukraine's network during the 2022 Russo-Ukrainian War. The company announced in early March 2022 that it was directly operating security products 24/7 for critical customers in Ukraine. More than 500 employees in Cisco were assisting at the time in collecting open-source intelligence for Talos to act on. Talos researchers also created Ukraine-specific protections based on the intelligence they received. The company also wrote about numerous cyberattacks targeting Ukraine during Russia's invasion, including countless spam campaigns and wiper malware families.

In December 2023, CNN reported on Cisco Talos' initiative to help protect Ukraine’s power grid amid ongoing Russian attacks. The effort addressed Russian interference with the GPS systems that Ukraine relies on to synchronize the signals necessary to manage its electricity flow. Cisco’s industrial Ethernet switches were modified and equipped with robust internal clocks known as oven-controlled crystal oscillators, so the substations could maintain accurate timing and communication even when GPS signals were jammed or unavailable. The prototypes were covertly delivered to Ukraine with assistance from U.S. agencies using humanitarian aid flights, and dozens of the devices were installed across the country, protecting Ukraine’s energy infrastructure.

== Vulnerability Research team ==
Cisco Talos has a Vulnerability Research team that identifies high-priority security vulnerabilities In computer operating systems, software and hardware, including platforms like ICS and IoT systems. This team works with vendors to disclose and patch more than 200 vulnerabilities a year.
