= 2025 cyberattack on the Polish power grid =

2025 cyberattack in Poland

The 2025 cyberattack on the Polish power grid began on 29 December 2025 and continued until the following day.

The attack targeted both IT devices and physical industrial devices, which is unusual. According to CERT Polska, the attacks hit more than 30 wind and solar farms but did not affect ongoing electricity production.

Targets included:

- Renewable energy plants
- a large combined heat and power plant
- a manufacturing company

In August 2026 CERT Polska published a follow-up report finding the incident considerably more complex than first believed. It described a previously undisclosed attack on a second, smaller combined heat and power plant in December 2025 and an attack vector involving a private APN.

== Attribution ==
The attack was attributed to Berserk Bear by CERT Polska and to Sandworm with medium confidence by ESET and Dragos Security.
