= Panda Cloud Antivirus =

Antivirus computer software

- Developer: Panda Security
- Release: November 10, 2009; 16 years ago
- Stable release: 16.1.1 / February 2016; 10 years ago
- Operating system: Windows XP SP3 or later
- Platform: 32-bit, 64-bit
- Available in: English, German, Spanish, Greek, French, Italian, Dutch, Polish, Portuguese, Russian, Swedish, Turkish and Chinese
- Type: Antivirus
- License: Proprietary
- Website: www.pandasecurity.com/homeusers/

Panda Cloud Antivirus was an antivirus software developed by Panda Security, a free and a paid version was available. It was cloud-based in the sense that files are scanned on a remote server without using processing power of the user's machine. The cloud technology is based on Panda's Collective Intelligence. It can run constantly, providing protection against viruses and malicious websites but slowing the system to some extent, or do a system scan.

== Features ==
According to Panda Security, Panda Cloud Antivirus was able to detect viruses, trojans, worms, spyware, dialers, hacking tools, hacker and other security risks.

Panda Cloud Antivirus relies on its "Collective Intelligence" and the cloud for up-to-date information. It normally uses an Internet connection to access up-to-date information; if the Internet cannot be accessed, it will use a local cache of "the most common threats in circulation".

== Reviews ==
An April 2009 review found Panda Cloud Antivirus 1.0 to be clean, fast, simple, easy to use, and with good detection rates. The same review scored Panda 100.00% in malware detection and 100.0% in malicious URL detection. Its overall score was 100%, a strong protection factor considering it is software.

When version 1.0 was released on November 10, 2009, PC Magazine reviewed Panda Cloud Antivirus and gave it an Editor's Choice Award for Best AV.

TechRadar's review states "We think that Panda Cloud Antivirus is best viewed as a defense tool rather than a utility for cleaning up a system that's already riddled with infection."

In a review by Softpedia about the new version of Panda Cloud Antivirus 3.0 it said that the removal of viruses is slow. The program would be mainly suitable for Internet users who do not frequently use dangerous and malware-prone sites.

== License ==
The free edition of Panda Cloud Antivirus was released under a license. Its usage was exclusively allowed for private households, state schools, non-governmental and non-profit organizations.
