= Christmas surprise =

Diplomatic tactic

In the field of diplomacy and international relations, a Christmas surprise is a tactic in which a state takes a bold action on or around Christmas day. The occasional method is often employed as a dramatic flourish, either to draw attention, or bargain in private negotiations. The tactic has also been used to retaliate or frustrate, forcing the recall of key staff who must interrupt their vacations to address the development. Use of the tactic is often not tied to the religiosity or religious affiliation of the countries involved. Some nations, such as North Korea, have warned of a Christmas surprise as a nonspecific threat. Both Russia and China have frequently used the holiday to unveil new weapons, and to engage in hybrid warfare, including cyber espionage and sabotage.

== In diplomatic negotiations ==
The Christmas holiday has long been used to advance a nation's negotiating position. During the Iran hostage crisis, Iran rebuffed a Christmas surprise arbitration offer by the United States in its decision to wait out the lame duck Carter administration. The holiday has also been used to smooth over tense diplomatic breakthroughs. In 2014, the United States and Cuba agreed to restore diplomatic relations after 53 years in a Christmas surprise settlement after 18 months of negotiations brokered by the Vatican and Canada. The tactic has also been used among countries when neither they nor their counterparty in negotiations have large Christian populations. In 2015, India's prime minister Narendra Modi made a surprise visit to Pakistan to meet Nawaz Sharif on Christmas in a bid to ease tensions between the countries, despite neither being a Christian-majority country.

== To debut weapons ==
Russia has long used the Christmas holiday sporadically to debut major weapons systems. In 1967, the Soviet Navy commissioned the S-703 Moskva helicopter carrier on Christmas Day. At 00:30 Christmas day 2013, the Russian Aerospace Forces launched the first Nivelir orbital anti-satellite weapon system into orbit. On Christmas in 2019, the Russian Navy launched K-573 Novosibirsk, the lead boat of the new Yasen-M class of attack submarines. On Christmas morning in 2020, Russia's Southern Military District announced it had placed into service the country's first operational Sukhoi Su-57 fighter aircraft.

In 2024, China used the holiday to unveil its new Chengdu J-36 fighter jet, and hours later, a new experimental Shenyang fighter jet. In 2025, the country marked the holiday by positioning a cargo ship packed with containerized weapons systems, including vertical launch systems, sensors, and radar arrays, all in their exposed deployed configuration, on the Huangpu River in downtown Shanghai.

== Hybrid warfare ==
=== Hacking ===
China is known for using the Christmas holiday to begin hacking campaigns against the United States. In an interview, Visi Stark of Mandiant said the company's choice to release its landmark report on the advanced persistent threat group APT-1 during Chinese New Year was retaliation for the Chinese military's frequent hacking campaigns on Christmas:

"I wanted to make sure that [the report] got … released during Chinese New Year … as a sort of mild "fuck you" [to China]. Because [the PLA] always [hack] a bunch of shit during Christmas [and ruin our holidays] … I wanted to make sure it happened during Chinese New Year so that we could see who got called back [to the office to deal with the fallout]."

Around Christmas 2025, a Chinese government hacking group reportedly made phishing attempts impersonating U.S. Congressman John Moolenaar, chairman of the House Select Committee on China, in an attempt to hack U.S. diplomats.

=== Sabotage ===
In the 2024 Estlink-2 sabotage incident, at noon on Christmas day, the Russian shadow fleet tanker Eagle S dragged its anchor along the seabed in the Baltic Sea severing a 170-kilometer power cable linking Finland and Estonia.
