= Mikel Urizarbarrena =

Spanish software developer

Mikel Urizarbarrena (born in Zaldibar, Basque Country, Spain) is the founder and former CEO of Antivirus Software maker Panda Software.

He founded the company in 1990, along with his wife (current vice chairman of the company) and two other friends, in the town of Durango, Biscay.

His company began as a developer of educational software for driver teaching schools. Mikel shifted his company to the antivirus market.

According to French national newspaper L'Express, Urizarbarrena is a member of the Church of Scientology whose first donation of $40,000 in 1996 has been repeated regularly since.
