= VPNFilter =

Malware targeting network routers and storage devices

VPNFilter is malware designed to infect routers and certain network attached storage devices. It is estimated to have infected approximately 500,000 routers worldwide at its peak, though the number of at-risk devices is larger. It can steal data, contains a "kill switch" designed to disable the infected router on command, and is able to persist should the user reboot the router. The FBI believes that it was created by the Russian Fancy Bear group. In February 2022, the CISA announced that a new malware called Cyclops Blink produced by Sandworm had replaced VPNFilter.

== Operation ==
VPNFilter is malware that infects a number of different kinds of network routers and storage devices. It seems to be designed in part to target serial networking devices using the Modbus protocol to talk to and control industrial hardware, as in factories and warehouses. The malware has special, dedicated code to target control systems using SCADA.

The initial infection vector is still unknown. The Cisco Talos security group hypothesizes the malware exploits known router security vulnerabilities to infect devices.

This software installs itself in multiple stages:

1. Stage 1 involves a worm which adds code to the device's crontab (the list of tasks run at regular intervals by the cron scheduler on Linux). This allows it to remain on the device after a reboot, and to re-infect it with the subsequent stages if they are removed. Stage 1 uses known URLs to find and install Stage 2 malware. If those known URLs are disabled, Stage 1 sets up a socket listener on the device and waits to be contacted by command and control systems.
2. Stage 2 is the body of the malware, including the basic code that carries out all normal functions and executes any instructions requested by special, optional Stage 3 modules.
3. Stage 3 can be any of various "modules" that tell the malware to do specific things, like sniffing network data, gathering credentials, serving as a relay point to hide the origin of subsequent attacks, or collecting data on industrial control devices (Modbus SCADA). Any exfiltrated data can then be encrypted via the Tor network.

== Mitigation ==
Both Cisco and Symantec suggest that people who own affected devices do a factory reset. That is typically accomplished by using a small, pointed object, such as a straightened out paperclip, to push the small reset button on the back on the unit for 10 to 30 seconds (time varies by model). This will remove the malware, but also restores the router to all original settings. If the router has remote management enabled, a factory reset will often disable this (the default setting of many routers). Remote management is thought to be one possible vector for the initial attack.

Before connecting the factory-reset router to the internet again, the device's default passwords should be changed to prevent reinfection.

== Devices at risk ==
The initial worm that installs VPNFilter can only attack devices running embedded firmware based on Busybox on Linux compiled only for specific processors. This does not include non-embedded Linux devices such as workstations and servers.

Manufacturer-provided firmware on the following router models is known to be at risk:

Asus
RT-AX92U
RT-AC66U
RT-N10
RT-N10E
RT-N10U
RT-N56U
RT-N66U
D-Link
DES-1210-08P
DIR-300
DIR-300A
DSR-250N
DSR-500N
DSR-1000
DSR-1000N
Huawei
HG8245
Linksys
E1200
E2500
E3000
E3200
E4200
RV082
WRVS4400N
Mikrotik
CCR1009
CCR1016
CCR1036
CCR1072
CRS109
CRS112
CRS125
RB411
RB450
RB750
RB911
RB921
RB941
RB951
RB952
RB960
RB962
RB1100
RB1200
RB2011
RB3011
RB Groove
RB Omnitik
STX5
Mikrotik RouterOS versions up to 6.38.5 on current or 6.37.5 on bugfix release chains
Netgear
DG834
DGN1000
DGN2200
DGN3500
FVS318N
MBRN3000
R6400
R7000
R8000
WNR1000
WNR2000
WNR2200
WNR4000
WNDR3700
WNDR4000
WNDR4300
WNDR4300-TN
UTM50
QNAP
TS251
TS439 Pro
Other QNAP NAS devices running QTS software
TP-Link
R600VPN
TL-WR741ND
TL-WR841N
Ubiquiti
NSM2
PBE M5
Upvel
Unknown Models (Note: Malware targeting Upvel as a vendor has been discovered, but we are unable to determine which specific device it is targeting.)
ZTE
ZXHN H108N

=== Epidemiology ===
VPNFilter is described by Cisco Talos as having infected as many as 500,000 devices worldwide, in perhaps 54 different countries, though proportionately the focus has been on Ukraine.

== FBI investigation ==
The FBI has taken a high-profile role in addressing this malware, conducting an investigation that resulted in the seizure of the domain name toknowall.com as ostensibly having been used to redirect queries from stage 1 of the malware, allowing it to locate and install copies of stages 2 and 3. The US Justice Department also compelled the site Photobucket to disable known URLs used to distribute malware Stage 2.

=== FBI recommendation on removing the infection ===
On 25 May 2018, the FBI recommended that users reboot their at-risk devices. This would temporarily remove the stages 2 and 3 of the malware. Stage 1 would remain, leading the router to try re-downloading the payload and infecting the router again. However, prior to the recommendation the US Justice Department seized web endpoints the malware uses for Stage 2 installation.

Without these URLs, the malware must rely on the fallback socket listener for Stage 2 installation. This method requires threat actor command and control systems to contact each system to install Stage 2, increasing the threat actor's risk of being identified. The FBI further recommended users disable remote management on their devices and update the firmware. A firmware update removes all stages of the malware, though it is possible the device could be reinfected.

The FBI said that this would help them to find the servers distributing the payload.
