= NPO Lepton =

Russian spaceborne optical sensor manufacturer

NPO Lepton, AO
- Logo of NPO Lepton
- Native name: НПО Лептон, AO
- Company type: Scientific production association (NPO)
- Industry: Defense industry; Space industry
- Founded: June 23, 1994
- Founder: Aleksej Borisov; Oleg Kazantsev; Mihail Krilov; Vitalij Matveev
- Headquarters: Zelenograd, Russia
- Key people: Oleg Kazantsev, general director
- Products: Space-based optical remote sensing instruments
- Revenue: ▲88 million ₽ (2024); 22 million ₽ (2023)
- Total assets: ▲2.4 billion ₽ (2024); 1.1 billion ₽ (2023)
- Number of employees: 59 (2024)
- Website: lepton.ru

NPO Lepton, AO, commonly called Lepton, is a Russian producer of optical remote sensing equipment, primarily for military space applications. Its primary product is a range of hyperspectral remote sensing cameras used in satellites. The company, based in the Moscow suburb of Zelenograd, develops part of the payload for Russia's Nivelir orbital anti-satellite weapon (ASAT) program. The company was sanctioned by the United States in 2024 and debarred by Taiwan in 2025.

== History ==
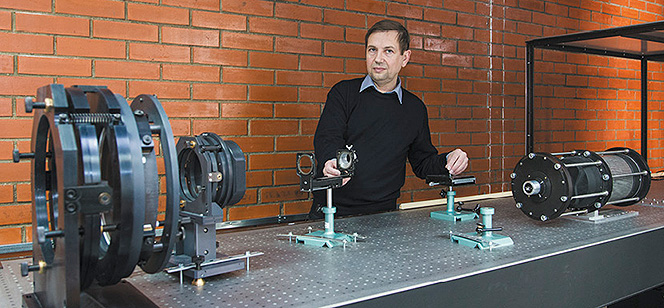
Lepton director Oleg Kazantsev in 2015.

NPO Lepton was founded June 23, 1994 as a startup spun out of National Research University of Electronic Technology (MIET) in Zelenograd. The company was founded by Aleksej Anatolevich Borisov, Oleg Yurevich Kazantsev, Mihail Vitalevich Krilov, and Vitalij Viktorovich Matveev, all graduates of the school, and the company continues to partner with MIET on product development. Lepton was incorporated as a joint stock company January 17, 2003, and founder Oleg Kasantsev remains director of the company.

Lepton receives funding from the Innovation Promotion Fund, an opaque Russian government-run venture capital seed fund for science and technology. As of 2024, the company's assets were worth 2.4 billion ₽ (US$28,500,000).

The company is named for the lepton, a subatomic elementary particle.

== Projects ==
=== Aerial monitoring ===
In the past Lepton built spectrometers for environmental monitoring systems fitted in a Yakovlev Yak-42D airborne collection platform for Roshydromet.

=== CubeSat sensing payloads ===
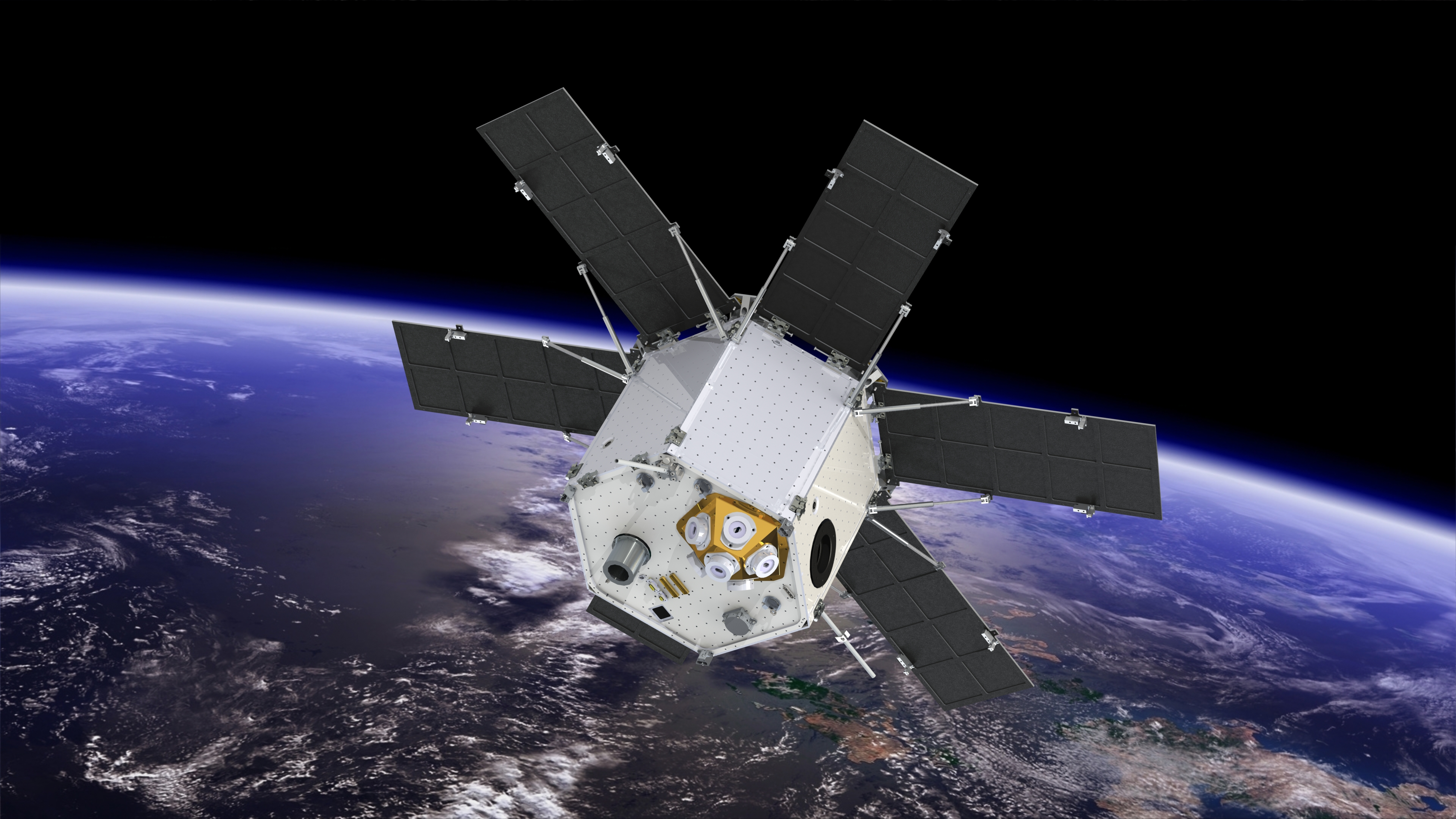
Render of the TabletSat-Aurora on orbit.

Lepton has produced multispectral imaging video spectrometer technology for CubeSats which deliver panchromatic and electro-optical color imagery. The camera is equipped with a thermal stabilization and focusing system, and onboard storage to enable imaging on demand without direct communication with a ground station. CubeSats containing a Lepton payload include Zond-PP (MKA-PN 1), TabletSat-Aurora, Baumanets-2, and OrbiCraft Zorky.

=== Nivelir ===
Lepton is involved in payload delivery for Russia's Nivelir satellite series, an anti-satellite weapon (ASAT) program. Lepton developed the satellite's Pribor-GS hyperspectral remote sensing camera system. The dual function camera system uses time delay integration for earth observation and its plane array detectors to focus on a target in orbit.

In 2018, Oleg Kazantsev admitted that Lepton supplied a high-resolution camera payload flown on Kosmos-2519, a Nivelir satellite which had been launched the year before.

The Pribor (Russian: "Instrument") series of hyperspectral payloads featured a range of sensor variants, each with an abbreviation denoting the type of camera, with “GS” meaning “hyperspectral.” GS-VR high resolution hyperspectral cameras in the series have been developed in three frequency bands:

- GS-VR-VD: visual band (0.4–0.9 microns) (70 channels)
- GS-VR-BIK: near-infrared band (0.9–1.7 microns) (40 channels)
- GS-VR-KIK: shortwave infrared band (2.0–2.4 microns) (20 channels)

=== CBRNE sensing ===
Lepton has developed a CBRNE hyperspectral sensing satellite payload, called the Hyperspectral Optical Complex, in collaboration with the 27th Scientific Center of the Russian Ministry of Defense, a chemical, biological, and radiological research institute sanctioned by the United States in 2021 for developing and testing chemical weapons. A joint scientific paper from the two organizations claims the sensor utilizes five different frequency bands from 0.4 microns (optical) to 12 microns (long-wavelength infrared). The report claims the sensor is intended to monitor nuclear power plants, nuclear waste sites and other “potentially dangerous industrial facilities”, study “technogenic catastrophes” caused by the release of radioactive and toxic substances, monitor areas affected by “terrorist attacks using nuclear, chemical and biological weapons”, and monitor plantations of psychoactive plants.

== Sanctions ==
United States — On August 23, 2024, NPO Lepton was added to the U.S. Treasury Office of Foreign Assets Control's Specially Designated Nationals and Blocked Persons List pursuant to Executive Order 14024.

Taiwan — On March 4, 2025, NPO Lepton was added to the Taiwanese Ministry of Economic Affairs Strategic High-Tech Commodities Entity List, an export ban debarring customers engaged in prohibited military applications.
