= Cyclops Blink =

Botnet-enabling malware targeting network hardware

Cyclops Blink is malicious Linux ELF executable, compiled for the 32-bit PowerPC (big endian) architecture. It targeted routers and firewall devices from WatchGuard and ASUS and adds them to a botnet for command and control (C&C). The malware is reported to be originated from the hacker group Sandworm.

Infection is through an exploit with the code CVE-2022-23176, which allows a privilege escalation to obtain management ability on the device. After a device has been infected, it acts as a command and control server, and its software design allows for further modules to be installed and be resilient to firmware upgrades.

== History ==
The malware has been around since at least June 2019.

Cyclops Blink was first reported on in February of 2022 after security advisories published by the United Kingdom's National Cybersecurity Centre (NCSC) and the United States' Cybersecurity and Infrastructure Security Agency (CISA) detailed its presence in the wild.

Thousands of routers were cleaned. Although Sandworm has attacked Ukrainian assets in the past, the malware has not targeted Ukrainian networking equipment and is thought to be unrelated to the Russo-Ukrainian War.
