= USA-338 =

American reconnaissance satellite

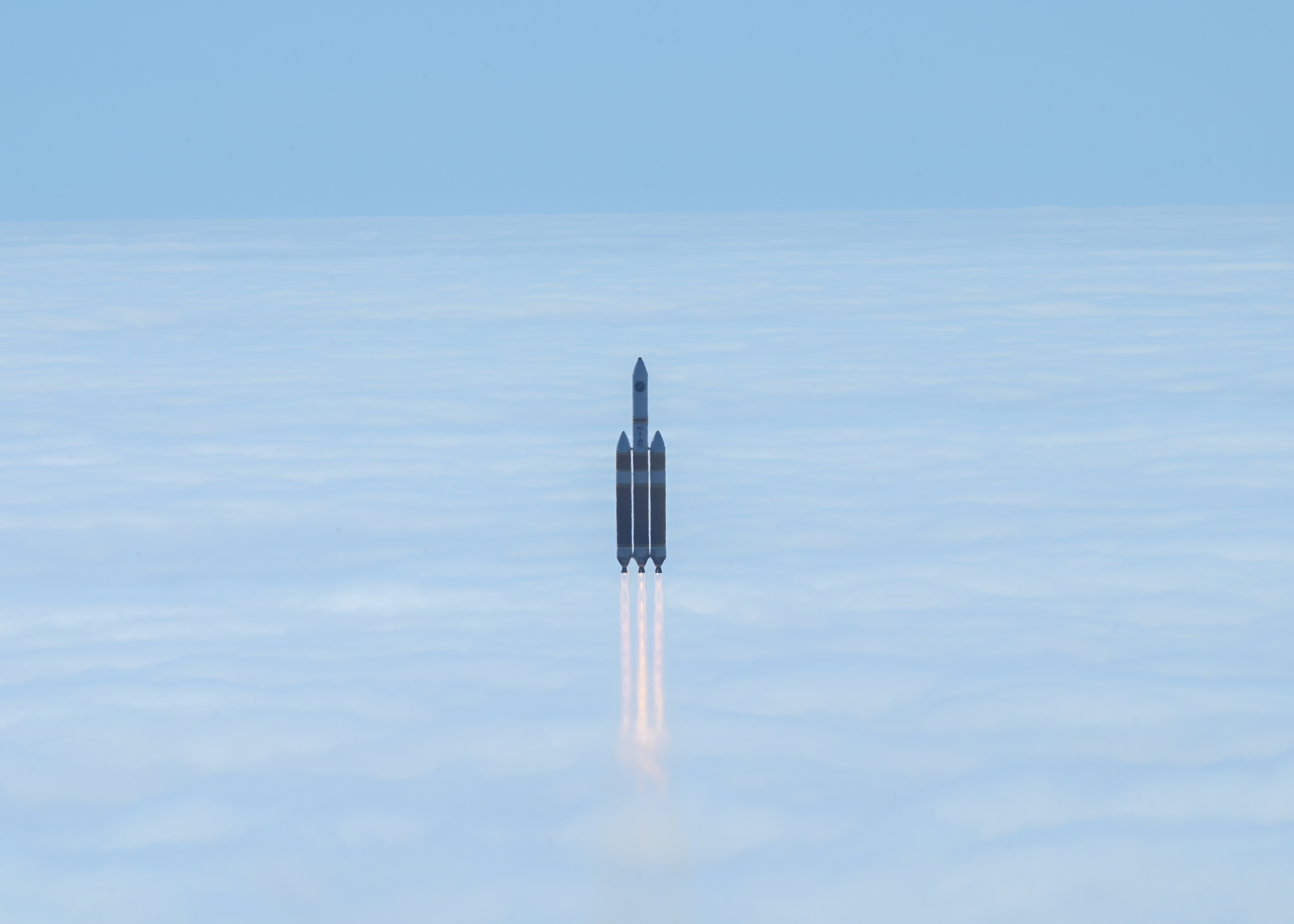
- Launch of USA-338
- Mission type: Optical imaging
- Operator: NRO
- COSPAR ID: 2022-117A
- SATCAT no.: 53883

Spacecraft properties
- Spacecraft type: KH-11
- Manufacturer: Lockheed Martin

Start of mission
- Launch date: 24 September 2022 22:25 UTC
- Rocket: Delta IV Heavy (D-387)
- Launch site: Vandenberg, SLC-6
- Contractor: United Launch Alliance

Orbital parameters
- Reference system: Geocentric orbit
- Regime: Sun-synchronous orbit
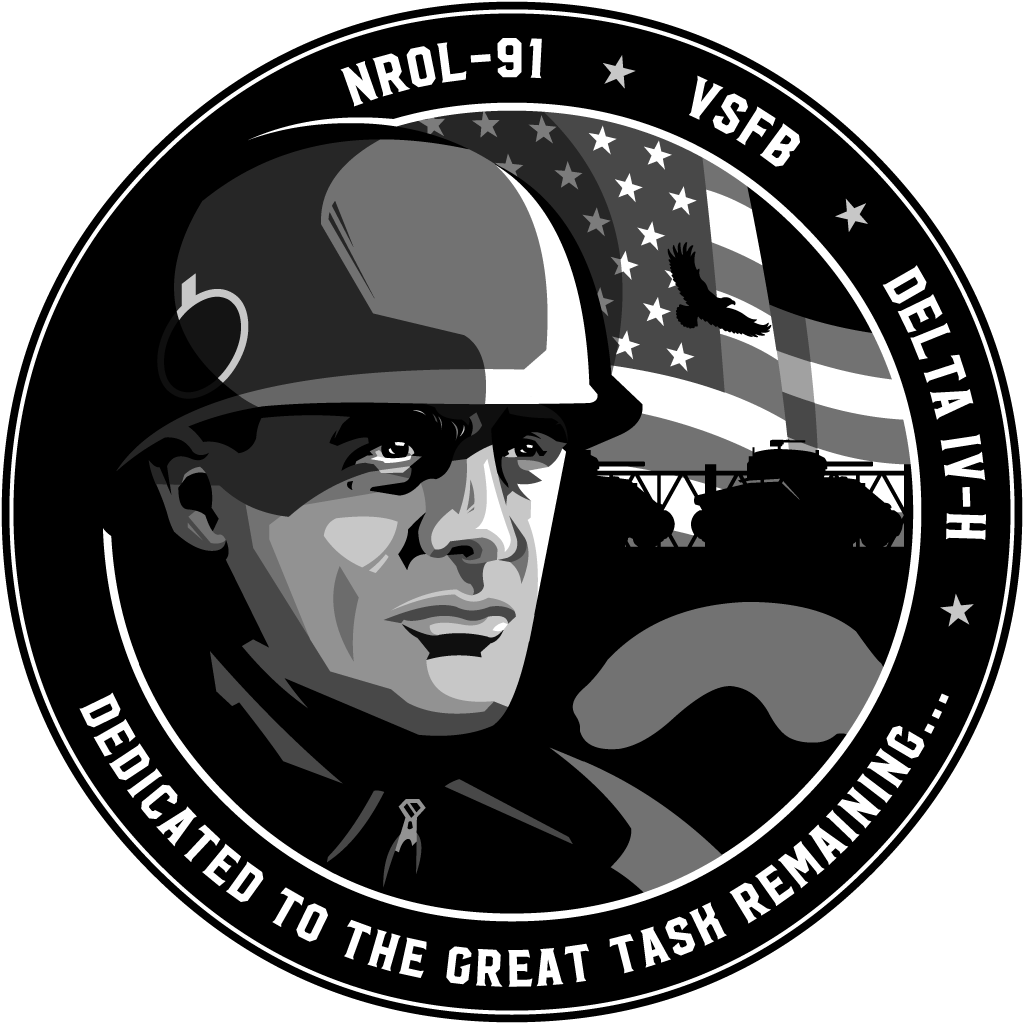
- KH-11 Series

USA-338 (also known as KH-11 19 and NROL-91) is an American reconnaissance satellite which is operated by the National Reconnaissance Office. Launched in September 2022, it is the KH-11 Block 5 reconnaissance satellite.

== Overview ==
The satellite launched on the last Delta IV Heavy launch and last Delta rocket launch from Vandenberg Space Force Base.

KH-11 KENNEN also known as Crystal is an electro-optical reconnaissance satellite which replaced the film-return satellites like KH-9 HEXAGON. It was early though that KH-11 Block 5 satellite could be Next Generation Misty satellite.

== Gallery ==
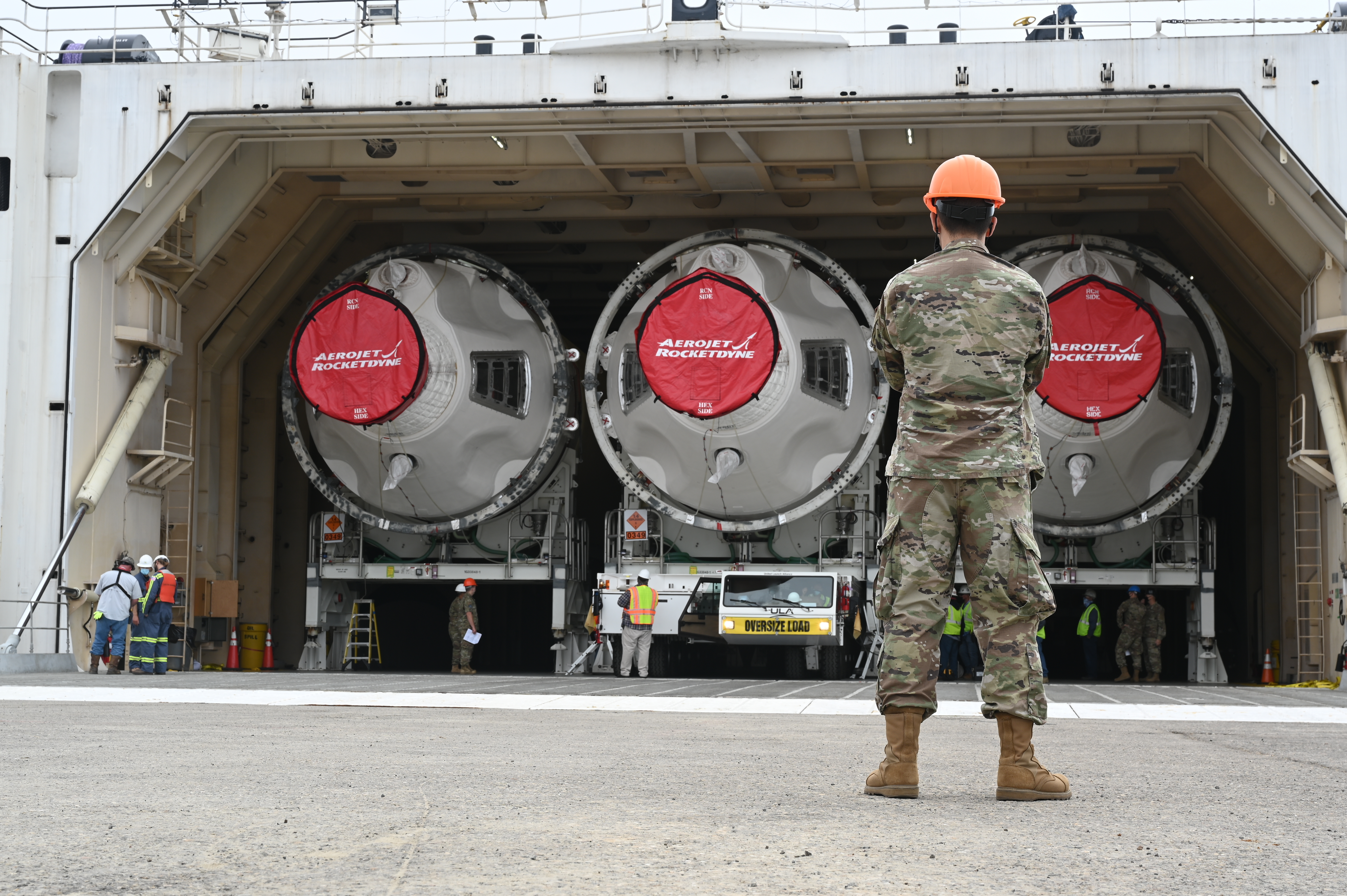

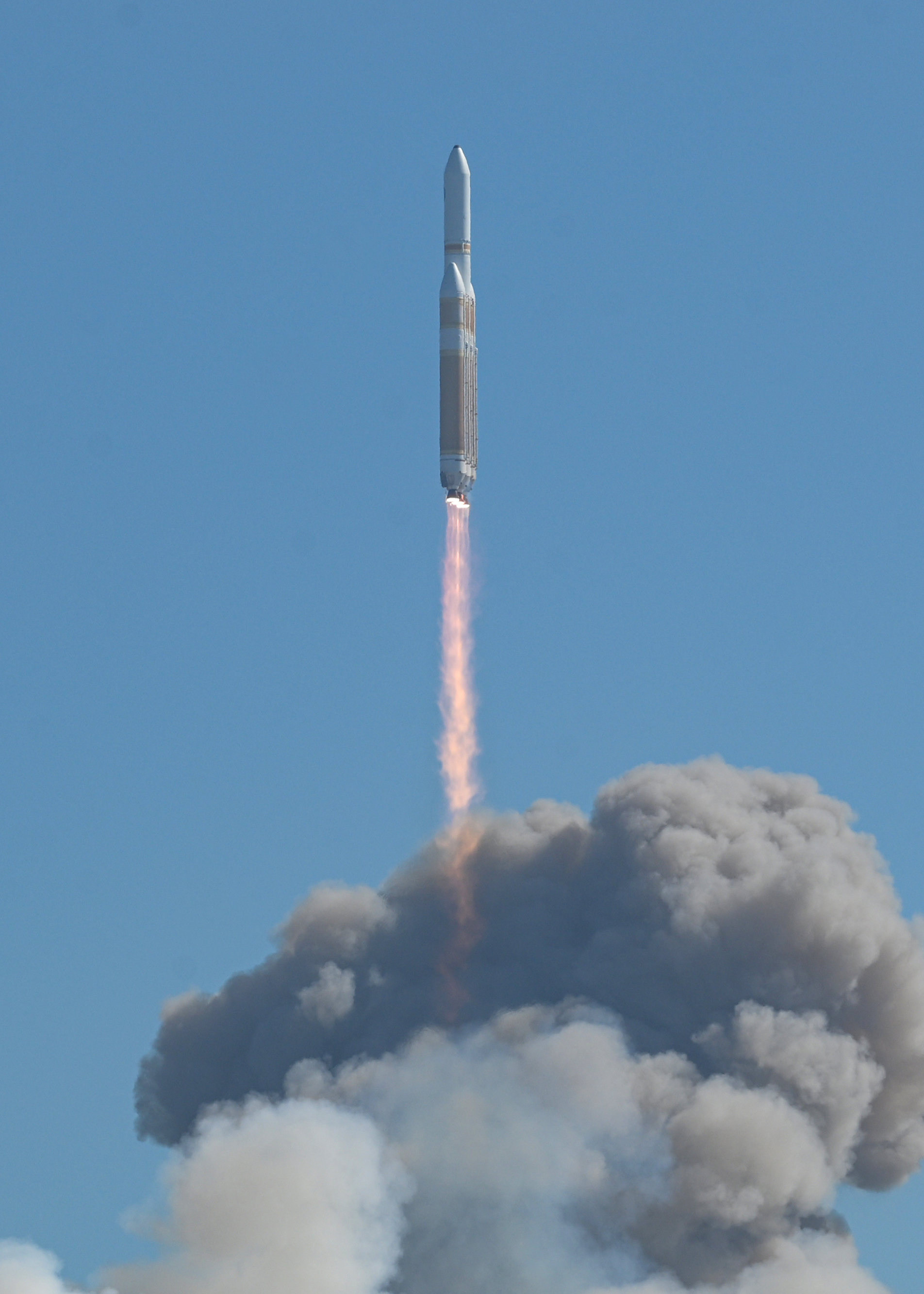

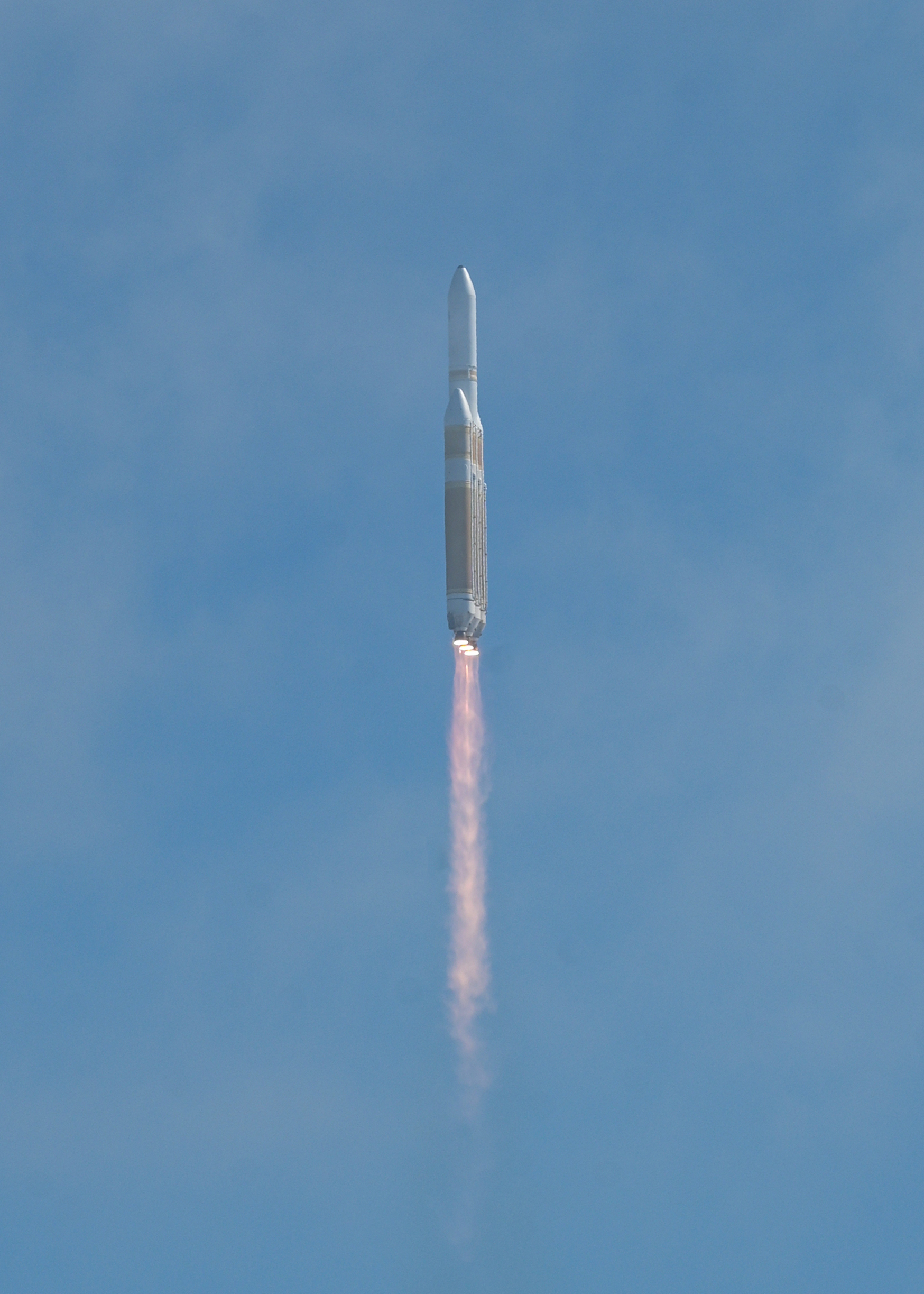

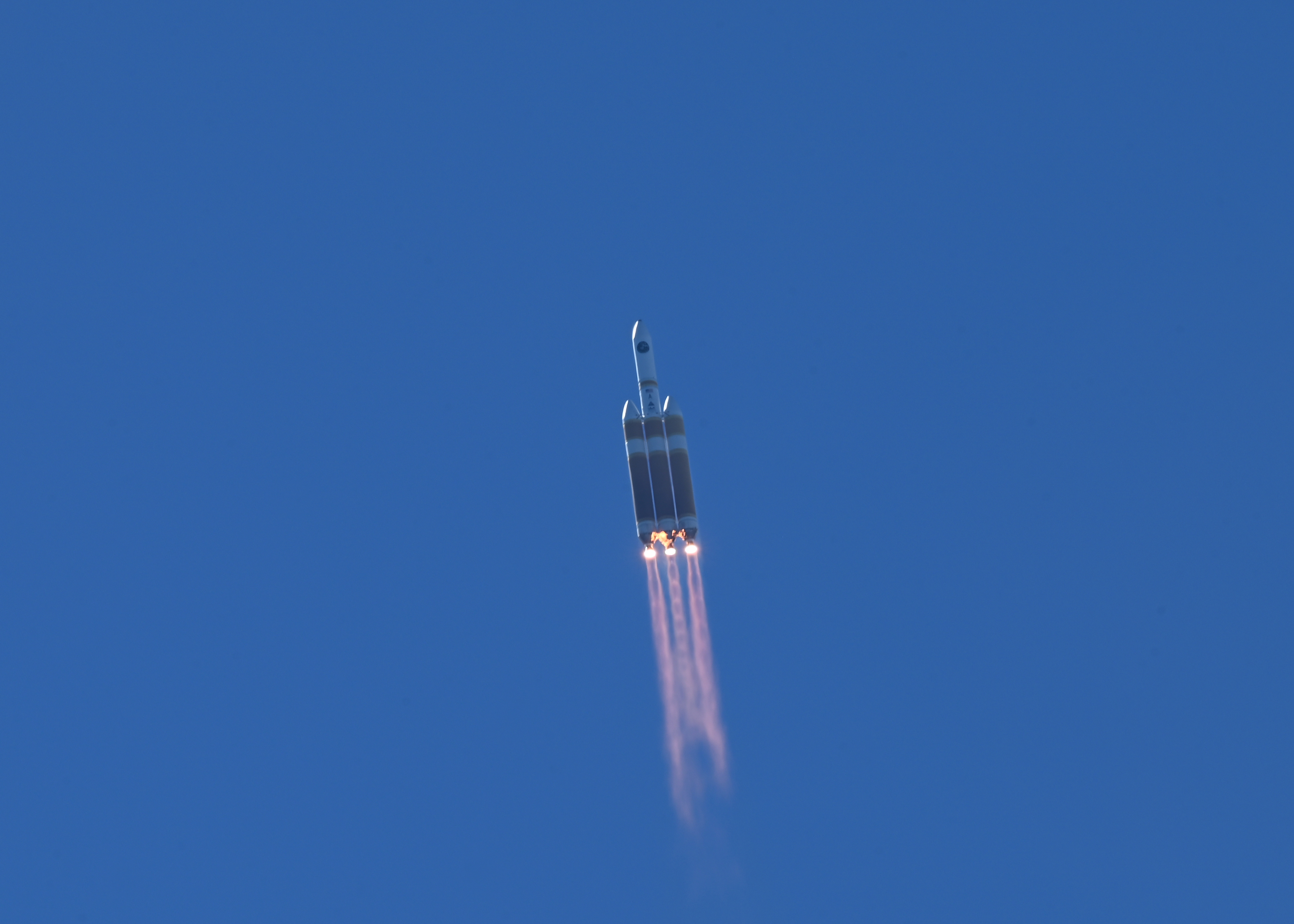

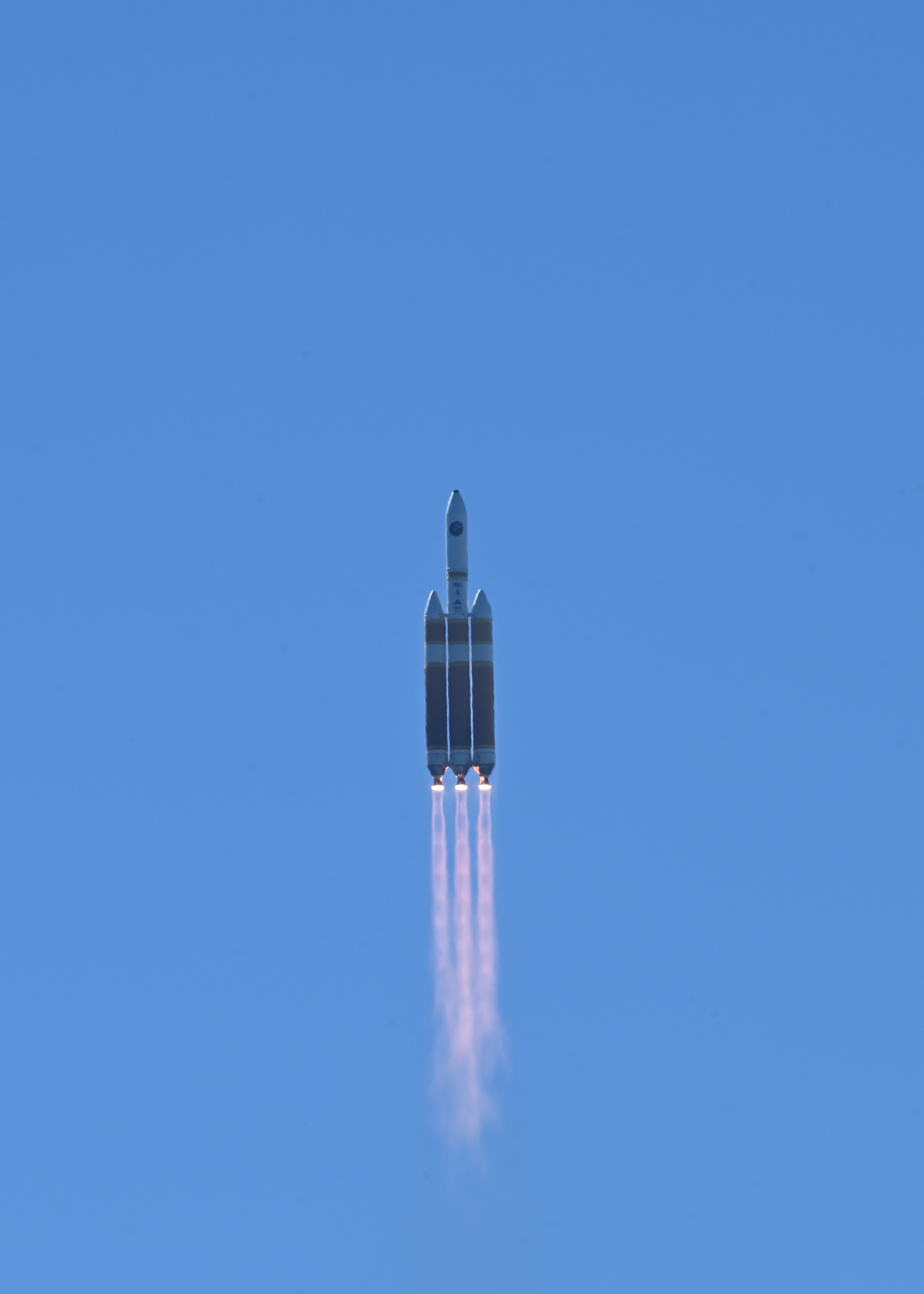

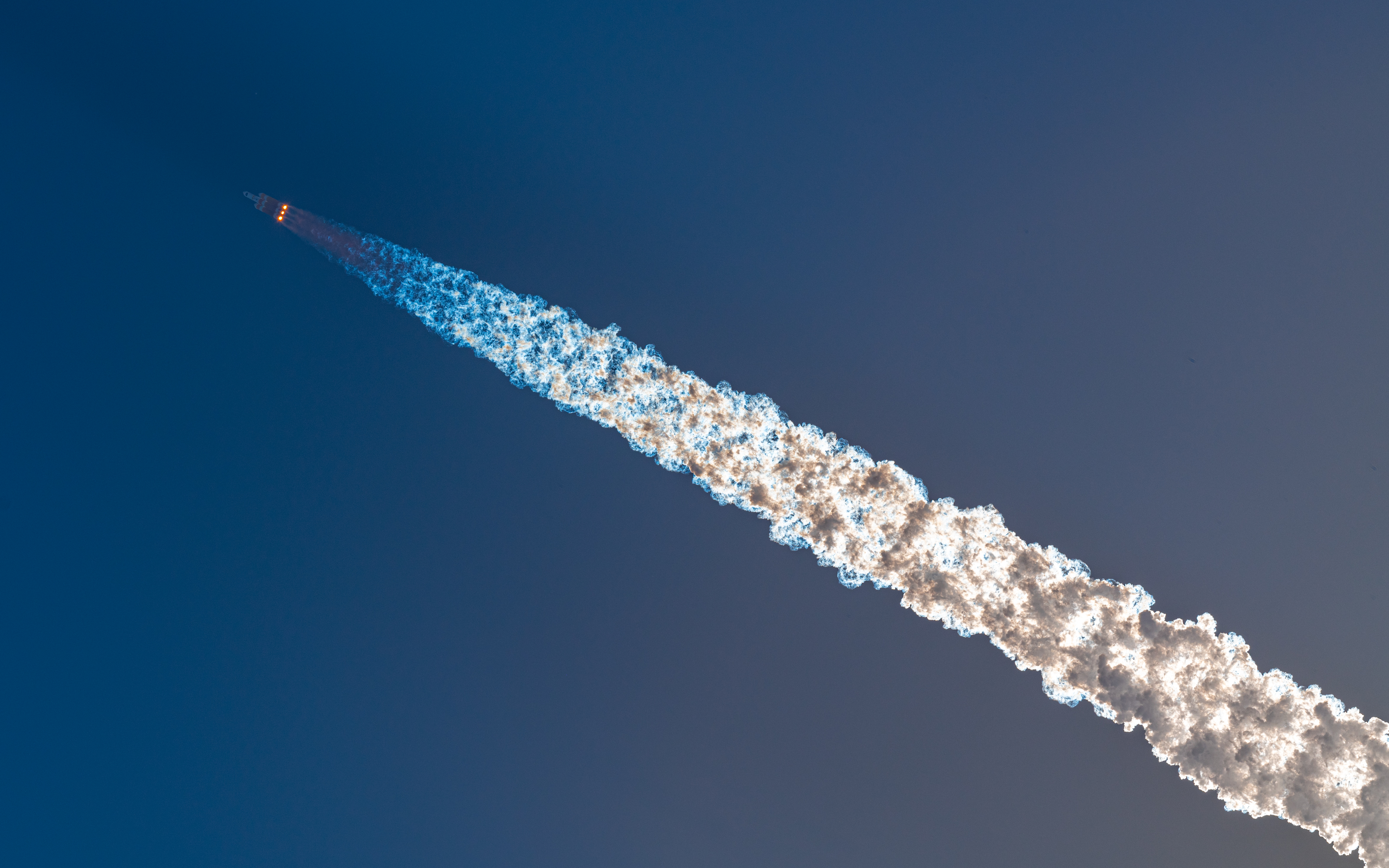

== See also ==
- List of USA satellites
- List of NRO Launches
- National Security Space Launch
