= WatchGuard =

American technology company

WatchGuard Technologies, Inc.
- Type: Private
- Industry: Network security and Computer security
- Founded: 1996; 30 years ago
- Headquarters: Seattle, Washington, United States
- Key people: Joe Smolarski, CEO
- Products: Unified Threat Management (UTM) devices, Next-generation firewalls, secure Wi-Fi devices, cloud-based threat intelligence, device detection
- Revenue: $252.1 Million USD (2022)
- Number of employees: 1,200+
- Website: watchguard.com

WatchGuard Technologies, Inc., is an American cybersecurity company based in Seattle, Washington. It specializes in network security solutions aimed at safeguarding computer networks from external threats such as malware and ransomware.

The company was founded in 1996.

== History ==
WatchGuard was initially established in 1996 under the name Seattle Software Labs, Inc. Its inaugural product was a network firewall known as the WatchGuard Security Management System, which included the WatchGuard Firebox, a "firewall in a box" security appliance, along with configuration and administration software.

In 1997, the company rebranded itself as WatchGuard Technologies, Inc.

WatchGuard Technologies, Inc. went public, trading on the Nasdaq in July 1999.

The company was acquired in 2006 by Vector Capital and Francisco Partners. Vector Partners became the majority owner in 2022. Bruce Coleman assumed the role of interim CEO.

In August 2007, Joe Wang took over as the company's permanent CEO, succeeding Coleman.

In May 2014, CEO Wang stepped down, and interim CEO Michael Kohlsdorf, an operating partner with Francisco Partners, assumed leadership.

In April 2015, Kohlsdorf passed the CEO mantle to Prakash Panjwani. WatchGuard announced that both Panjwani and Kohlsdorf were joining the company's board..

In October, the company launched the WatchGuard Wi-Fi Cloud to expand its network security coverage to Wi-Fi networks.

In July 2018, the company unveiled AuthPoint, an application designed to offer multi-factor authentication security for businesses.

== Acquisitions ==
In June 2016, the company acquired HawkEye G, a threat-detection and response technology from Hexis Cyber Solutions, now part of KEYW Holding Corp.

In August 2017, WatchGuard acquired Datablink, a provider of multi-factor authentication software used to secure laptops, servers, and other devices.

In January 2018, the company acquired Percipient Networks, a domain name system security service provider. Later, it was renamed to DNSWatch.

In March 2020, WatchGuard announced an agreement to acquire Bilbao-based Panda Security, a provider of network endpoint security. The deal was finalized in June.

== Products ==
The company develops security products and services for businesses. There are four product groups: Network Security, Endpoint Security, Secure Wi-Fi, and Multi-Factor Authentication.

The Network Security devices are categorized as Unified Threat Management (UTM), where a single device provides multiple security features. The devices include WatchGuard Dimension, a network discovery tool that allows administrators to identify devices on the network, including mobile devices; and WatchGuard Cloud, giving the devices access to online threat intelligence.

The Endpoint Security offering includes products and services that provide advanced endpoint security, endpoint antivirus, security operations, and DNS-level protection and content filtering.

The Secure Wi-Fi product line consists of secure indoor and outdoor Wave 1 and Wave 2 802.11ac Wi-Fi hardware, security subscription services, and WatchGuard's Wi-Fi Cloud, a management platform used to control the devices.

The Multi-Factor Authentication group includes the company's AuthPoint application, a multi-factor authentication management and reporting tool that prevents unauthorized users from accessing sensitive cloud applications, VPNs, and networks.

The company also issues a quarterly security report based on feed data from WatchGuard UTM appliances installed at customer sites. The report highlights the type and frequency of malicious attacks occurring on computer networks.
