= Central Scientific Research Institute of Chemistry and Mechanics =

Research institute in Russia

Coordinates: 55.672°N 37.643°E

The Federal State Unitary Enterprise Central Scientific Research Institute of Chemistry and Mechanics (Russian: ФГУП "Центральный научно-исследовательский институт химии и механики", abbreviated as TsNIIKhM or CNIIHM) is a research institute in Russia, established in 1894. Its headquarters are in Nagatinskaya Street in Moscow.

== History ==
The institute's foundation in 1894 is directly related to the formation of the gunpowder industry of the Russian Empire. The base for the institute was the Central Factory Laboratory of the Okhtinsky Powder Plant.

During the Soviet period, it became one of the state research institutes of the USSR, focussing on the development of explosives and weapons design, and later aerospace engineering for the Soviet rocketry program.

During this period, it was awarded the Order of the Red Banner of Labour and the Order of the October Revolution.

== Present day ==
The institute continues to work in the field of defense and national security, and developing high-tech dual-use and civilian products for major industries.

As of 2023 it was listed on the Swiss State Secretariat for Economic Affairs Sanctions/Embargoes list, and the U.S. Treasury's Office of Foreign Assets Control CAATSA list.

In 2018, FireEye, a company that researches cyber-security, reported that the Triton malware most likely came from CNIIHM.
