= 2015 Ukraine power grid hack =

First registered successful hacking attack on power grid

On December 23, 2015, the power grid in two western oblasts of Ukraine was hacked, which resulted in power outages for roughly 230,000 consumers in Ukraine for 1-6 hours. The attack took place during the ongoing Russo-Ukrainian War (2014–present) and is attributed to a Russian advanced persistent threat group known as "Sandworm". It is the first publicly acknowledged successful cyberattack on a power grid.

== Description ==
On 23 December 2015, hackers using the BlackEnergy 3 malware remotely compromised information systems of three energy distribution companies in Ukraine and temporarily disrupted the electricity supply to consumers. Most affected were consumers of Prykarpattyaoblenergo (Ukrainian: Прикарпаттяобленерго; servicing Ivano-Frankivsk Oblast): 30 substations (7 110kv substations and 23 35kv substations) were switched off, and about 230,000 people were without electricity for a period from 1 to 6 hours.

At the same time, consumers of two other energy distribution companies, Chernivtsioblenergo (Ukrainian: Чернівціобленерго; servicing Chernivtsi Oblast) and Kyivoblenergo (Ukrainian: Київобленерго; servicing Kyiv Oblast) were also affected by a cyberattack, but at a smaller scale. According to representatives of one of the companies, attacks were conducted from computers with IP addresses allocated to the Russian Federation.

The previous month, Ukrainian activists had damaged four electricity transmission lines in Ukraine supplying electricity to Crimea, causing about 1.6 million people and 150 schools in Crimea to be without power. Ukrinterenergo repaired the lines a few days later, as Russia was considering stopping supplies of coal to Ukraine in response.

== Vulnerability ==
In 2019, it was argued that Ukraine was a special case, comprising unusually dilapidated infrastructure, a high level of corruption, the ongoing Russo-Ukrainian War, and exceptional possibilities for Russian infiltration due to the historical links between the two countries. The Ukrainian power grid was built when it was part of the Soviet Union, has been upgraded with Russian parts and (as of 2022), still not been fixed. Russian attackers are as familiar with the software as operators. Furthermore, the timing of the attack during the holiday season guaranteed only a skeleton crew of Ukrainian operators were working (as shown in videos).

== Method ==
The cyberattack was complex and consisted of the following steps:

- Prior compromise of corporate networks using spear-phishing emails with BlackEnergy malware
- Seizing SCADA under control, remotely switching substations off
- Disabling/destroying IT infrastructure components (uninterruptible power supplies, modems, RTUs, commutators)
- Destruction of files stored on servers and workstations with the KillDisk malware
- Denial-of-service attack on call-center to deny consumers up-to-date information on the blackout.
- Emergency power at the utility company's operations center was switched off.

In total, up to 73 MWh of electricity was not supplied (or 0.015% of daily electricity consumption in Ukraine).

== See also ==
- 2016 Kyiv cyberattack, which resulted in another power outage
- Ukrenergo, electricity transmission system operator in Ukraine
- Ukrainian energy crisis, 2024 energy shortage in Ukraine
- 2017 cyberattacks on Ukraine
- Russo-Ukrainian cyberwarfare
- Cyberwarfare by Russia
- Vulkan files leak
- 2025 cyberattack on Polish power grid
