= International sanctions =

Punitive economic measures between nations

International sanctions are measures that can be used by individual countries or multilateral and regional organizations against other states or organizations. These decisions principally include the temporary imposition on a target of economic, trade, diplomatic, cultural or other restrictions (sanctions measures).

According to Chapter VII of the United Nations Charter, only the UN Security Council has a mandate by the international community to apply sanctions (Article 41) that must be complied with by all UN member states (Article 2,2). They serve as the international community's most powerful peaceful means to prevent threats to international peace and security or to settle them. Sanctions do not include the use of military force. However, if sanctions do not lead to the diplomatic settlement of a conflict, the use of force can be authorized by the Security Council separately under Article 42.

UN sanctions should not be confused with unilateral sanctions that are imposed by individual countries in furtherance of their strategic interests, which is a form of economic warfare. Typically intended as strong economic coercion, measures applied under unilateral sanctions can range between coercive diplomatic efforts, economic warfare, or as preludes to war.

For the first 45 years of the United Nations' history, sanctions were only imposed twice: once against Rhodesia in 1966 and then against South Africa in 1977. From 1991, there was a sharp increase in their usage. The UN voted for sanctions twelve times in the 1990s alone. According to Thomas G. Weiss, the soar in sanctions can be attributed to the shift in attitudes as a consequence of the end of the Cold War, where there was a "newfound willingness" from UN member nations to "intrude in issues that were once off-limits".

== Types ==
There are several types of sanctions.

- Economic sanctions – typically a ban on trade, possibly limited to certain sectors such as armaments, or with certain exceptions (such as food and medicine)
- Diplomatic sanctions – the reduction or removal of diplomatic ties, such as embassies.
- Military sanctions – military intervention
- Sport sanctions – preventing one country's people and teams from competing in international events.
- Sanctions on the environment – since the declaration of the United Nations Conference on the Human Environment, international environmental protection efforts have been increased gradually.

Economic sanctions are distinguished from trade sanctions, which are applied for purely economic reasons, and typically take the form of tariffs or similar measures, rather than bans on trade.

=== Economic sanctions ===
Economic sanctions can range from trade barriers, tariffs, and restrictions on financial transactions to a full naval blockade of the target's ports in an effort to block imported goods. The objective of the sanctioning country is to impose significant costs on the target country to coerce a policy change or attain a specific action from the target government. However, the effectiveness of economic sanctions has been challenged, as some believe their harsh impacts can cause more harm to the general population than to the target regimes they are designed to hurt.

=== Diplomatic sanctions ===
Diplomatic sanctions are political measures taken to express disapproval or displeasure at a certain action through diplomatic and political means, rather than affecting economic or military relations. Measures include limitations or cancellations of high-level government visits or expelling or withdrawing diplomatic missions or staff.

=== Military sanctions ===
Similarly, military sanctions can range from carefully targeted military strikes to degrade a nation's conventional or non-conventional capabilities, to the less aggressive form of an arms embargo to cut off supplies of arms or dual-use items.

=== Sport sanctions ===
Sport sanctions are used as a way of psychological warfare, intended to crush the morale of the general population of the target country. Sports sanctions were imposed as part of the international sanctions against Federal Republic of Yugoslavia, 1992–1995, enacted by UN Security Council by resolution 757. The Gleneagles Agreement approved by the Commonwealth of Nations in 1977, committed member nations to discourage contact and competition between their sportsmen and sporting organizations, teams, or individuals from South Africa. However, it was not binding and unable to stop events such as the 1980 British Lions tour to South Africa or the 1981 South Africa rugby union tour of New Zealand. During the 2022 Russian invasion of Ukraine, many sporting bodies imposed sport sanctions against Russia and Belarus. The target countries are usually not allowed to host any sporting events and are not allowed to have their flag and state symbols displayed.

=== Sanctions on the environment ===
Sanctions on the environment include both economic and political issues such as trade since these are all interdependent. The trade barriers and restrictions on trade are the key factors since they are engaged with the problems of endangered species, ozone-depleting chemicals, and environmental laws. Although the sanctions and laws regarding the environment are relatively new, recent concerns over environmental issues encouraged individuals and governments to actively cooperate in dealing with the problems.

=== Sanctions on individuals ===
The United Nations Security Council can implement sanctions on political leaders or economic individuals. These persons usually find ways of evading their sanction because of political connections within their nation.

== Reasons for sanctioning ==
Sanctions formulations are designed into three categories. The categories are used to differentiate between the political contexts due to the global nature of the act.

The first category consists of sanctions designed to force compliance with international law. This can be seen in the sanctions imposed on Iraq through Resolution 661 on August 6, 1990, after its invasion of Kuwait. The United Nations placed an embargo on the nation in an attempt to prevent armed conflict. Resolutions 665 and 670 were subsequently added, creating both naval and air blockades on Iraq. The purpose of the initial sanctions was to compel Iraq to comply with international law, which included recognizing the sovereignty of Kuwait.

The second category of design consists of sanctions aimed at containing threats to peace within geographical boundaries. The 2010 Iran nuclear proliferation debate serves as a contemporary example. The United Nations Security Council passed Resolution 1929 on June 9, which imposed restrictions on missile and weaponry materials that could be used for creating destructive weapons. The principle behind these restrictions was to contain the possibility of Iranian aggression within the neighboring region.

The third category involves the United Nations Security Council's condemnation of actions of a specific action or policy of a member/non-member nation. The white minority declared Rhodesian Independence on November 11, 1965. The General assemble and United Nations in a 107 to 2 vote took to condemning Rhodesia on all military, economic, as well as oil and petroleum products. The international display of disapproval forced sanctions onto the Rhodesian people, but without a clear goal as to a remedy for the economic sanctions.

The three categories are a blanket explanation of the reasons sanctions are applied to nations, but it does not go as far as to say that voting members share the same political reasons for imposing them. It is often the case for many nations to be driven by self-interests in one or more categories when voting on whether or not to implement sanctions.

== Support of use ==
Sanctions have long been the subject of controversy as scholars question their effects on citizens, the level of ethnocentrism involved when designing and implementing sanctions, and the possibility of ineffectiveness.

Supporters of sanctions argue that regardless of sanctions' effects on a group of people, those citizens were most likely already being oppressed by their government. Supporters also argue that sanctions are the best alternative international tool, as opposed to taking no action, and that in the absence of sanctions, oppressive regimes have no incentive to reform.

On the side of the opposition, it is asserted that sanctions are a way to promote nationalistic values and diminish the culture of a state. In counterargument, support is argued on the basis that something must be done and democratic peace theory is cited as sound reasoning despite any possible cultural insensitivity.

In regards to the effectiveness of the sanctions, supporters concede that multilateral sanctions have been found to work 33% of the time.

There are several ways to remove and dissolve sanctions that have been imposed on a nation(s). In some cases, such as those imposed on Iraq in 1990, only a new resolution can be used to lift the sanctions. This is done when no provision is put in the resolution for the lifting of sanctions. This is generally only done if the sanctioned party has shown a willingness to adopt certain conditions of the Security Council. Another way sanctions can be lifted is when time limits are implemented with the initial sanction. After an extended duration, the sanction will eventually be lifted off the nation, with or without cooperation. The practice of time limitations has grown over the years and allows for a gradual removal of restrictions on nations conforming, at least in part, to conditions imposed by sanctioning bodies, such as the U.N. Security Council.

== Criticism ==
It is sometimes claimed that sanctions imposed by single countries or by an intergovernmental body like the United Nations are "illegal" or "criminal" due to, in the case of economic sanctions, the right to development or, in the case of military sanctions, the Right of self-defense.

Professor Thomas G. Weiss describes sanctions as giving nations the "ability to 'do something' and engage in cheap moralizing but refrain from serious engagement", denouncing them as moral posturing with little impact. Jovan Babić & Aleksandar Jokić also criticize sanctions, but argue that their impact is significant: "sanctions produce morally reprehensible consequences that undermine their often-cited moral justification".

=== Impact on civilians ===
A 1996 report by International Progress Organization criticized sanctions as "an illegitimate form of collective punishment of the weakest and poorest members of society, the infants, the children, the chronically ill, and the elderly".

A notable case of sanctions having a catastrophic impact on civilians is in Iraq. In the hopes of forcing Saddam Hussein to comply with requests to inspect Iraq's nuclear capability - or to invoke a coup d'etat - the UN imposed sanctions against Iraq. As a consequence, the GDP was halved. The cost of food for a family increased by 25000% in the space of 5 years. Between 1991 and 1998, it has been estimated that the sanctions resulted in between 100,000 and 250,000 children dying. Ultimately, the sanctions did not yield concessions from Hussain's government, and some academics use this case study to bring the efficacy of such sanctions into question.

Some policymakers view the civilian impact as necessary. In the words of US ambassador to the UN Madeleine Albright, "the price was worth it" (although in a 2020 interview, she later retracted this statement as "totally stupid").

Some scholars also highlight the UN's sanctions against former Yugoslavian republics from 1991 to 1995. In some ways, they could be considered a success as they prevented a wider conflict in Europe. However, the sanctions had catastrophic consequences. Less than a year after the first sanctions, average household income halved from $3,000/year to $1,500/year, according to estimates by economist Miroljub Labus. In October 1993, the office of the United Nations High Commissioner for Refugees in Belgrade estimated that approximately 3 million people living in Serbia and Montenegro were living at or below the poverty line. Vulnerable & sick people suffered the most, and by 1993 most hospitals lacked basic medicines such as antibiotics and functioning equipment such as X-ray devices. In November 1994, 87 patients died in Belgrade's Institute of Mental Health due to lack of heat, food, or medicine. In the same year, The New York Times reported that suicide rates had increased by 22%.

At the 50th anniversary of the UN in January 1995, the incumbent UN Secretary General Boutros Boutros-Ghali highlighted the negative effects of sanctions:

"a blunt instrument [that raises] the ethical question of whether suffering inflicted on vulnerable groups in the target country is a legitimate means of exerting pressure on political leaders whose behavior is unlikely to be affected by the plight of their subjects."

— Boutros-Ghali, former UN Secretary General

Boutros-Ghali also highlighted the UN's duty of care to ensure that vulnerable groups are provided with humanitarian aid during the economic fallout of the sanctions they impose.

=== Paternalism ===
Paternalism is the philosophy that one party is unaware of what is in their best interests, so another party must 'save' them, like a paternal father figure. This presupposes that the paternal party is superior and that the party in need of intervention should not have autonomy over themselves, which should instead be given to the paternal party to act on their behalf. Jovan Babić & Aleksandar Jokić argue that sanctions are an act of paternalism.

They contend that sanctions "reinforce the position that some nations are not "adult enough" "while other nations are authorized (perhaps bound by duty) to lend a helping hand." This, they believe, contradicts the liberal notion that all peoples and nations are created equal. Babić & Jokić further assert that this attitude results in the sanctioned population being portrayed as incompetent and infantile people undeserving of dignity who it is morally permissible to allow to suffer as a consequence of sanctions.

=== Measuring success ===
Measuring the success of sanctions - and when they should be lifted - is often difficult.

UN Secretary General Boutros-Ghali commented that the objectives of imposing sanctions can often be unclear and shift over time, making it "difficult to agree upon when the objectives can be considered to have been achieved and sanctions can be lifted".

According to Thomas G. Weiss, the sanctions against the states of the former Yugoslavia in the 1990s could be considered a success as they prevented a wider conflict in Europe. Ultimately, the sanctions were lifted with the signing of the Dayton Agreement in 1995 which saw the end of combat.

== See also ==
- Autarky
- Boycott
- Cyber sanctions
- Enforcement
- Accountability
- Humanitarian intervention
- Sanctions involving Russia
- India sanctions
- United States sanctions
- Dima Yakovlev Law
- Magnitsky Act
- Interdict
