= Silent Horizon =

Silent Horizon is a United States war exercise that simulates cyberwarfare. It is run by the Central Intelligence Agency, an independent civilian intelligence agency of the United States government. The war exercise was first held in 2005, and the scenario was five years in the future in which an attack on the same scale as the September 11 attacks takes place and includes hackers hired by anti-American organizations. The Information Operations Center at the CIA ran the war exercise, and around 75 officials, mostly from the CIA, participated in the exercise, reacting to different attacks. The exercise took place in Charlottesville, Virginia. The CIA did not make public its findings. Edward V. Linden, in Focus on Terrorism, said, "The national security simulation was considered significant because many U.S. counterterrorism experts feel that far-reaching effects from a cyberattack are highly unlikely."

Richard A. Clarke said in 2010 that Silent Horizon has been taking place every year since 2007.
