= Cyber ShockWave =

2010 US-based wargame

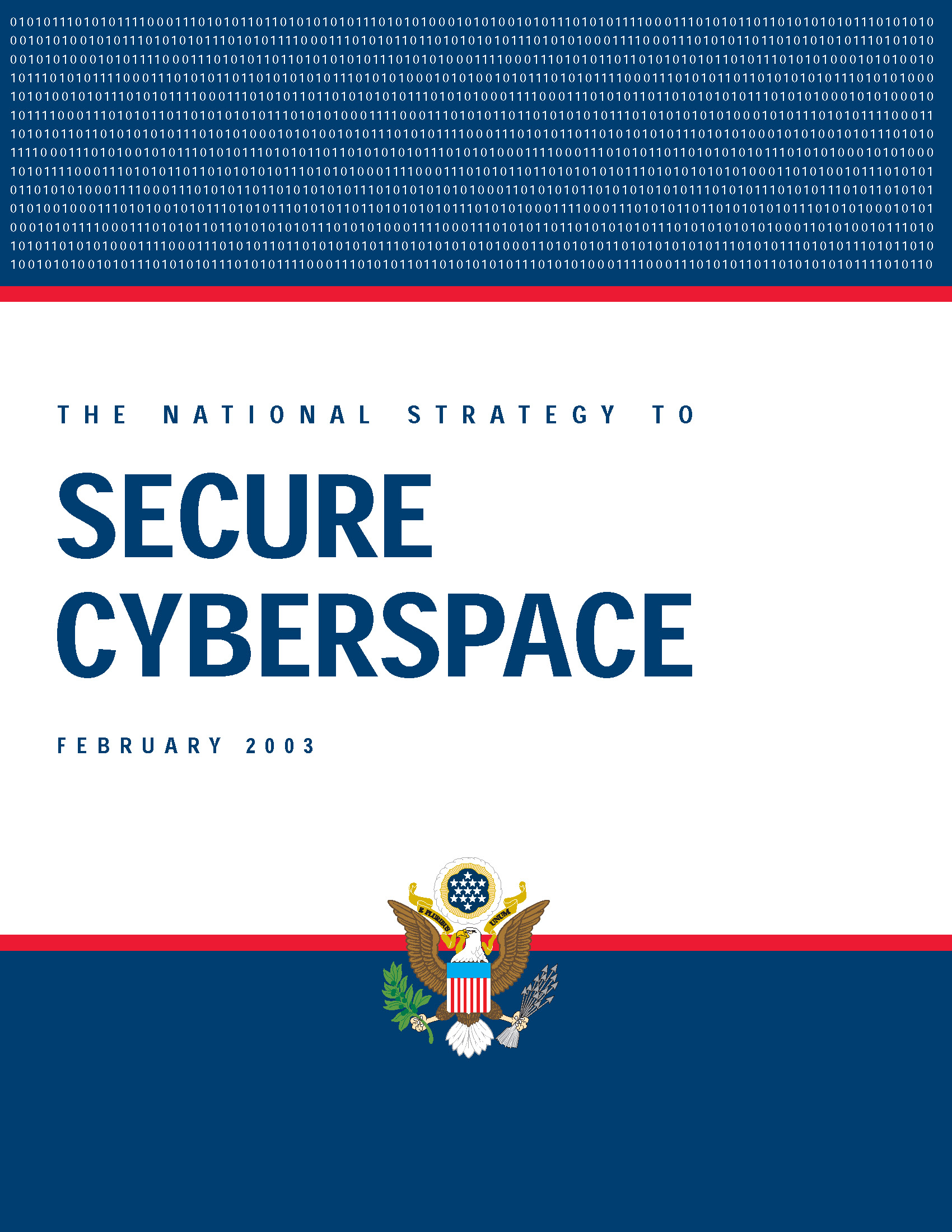
Cover of The National Strategy to Secure Cyberspace

Cyber ShockWave, similar to the Cyber Storm Exercise, was a 4-hour wargame conducted in February 2010 by the Bipartisan Policy Center, an American think tank based in Washington, D.C. Former high-ranking Cabinet and National Security Officials role played a cabinet level response to a cyberwarfare scenario. Portions of the exercise were later broadcast on CNN.

== Background ==
Cyberwarfare has become a major threat to the United States. There is current debate over whether cyberwarfare constitutes actual war or a rhetorical and less threatening concept instead. Control of the Internet has long been an issue of Internet security and electronic privacy.

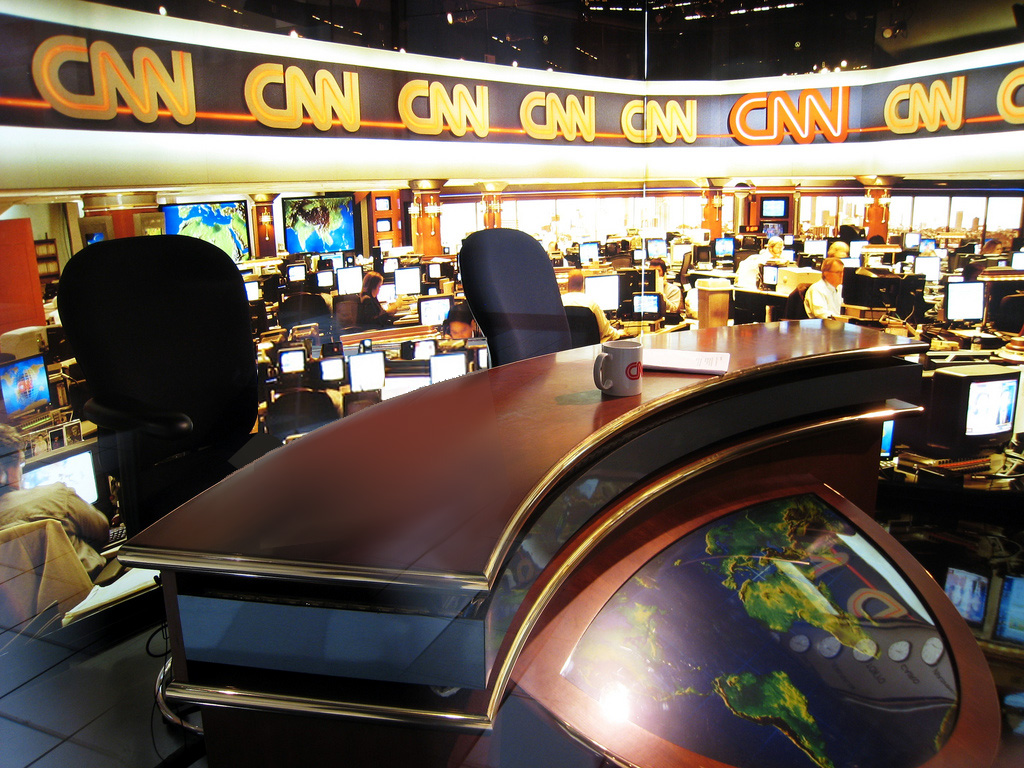
"CNN broadcasting where Cyber Shockwave simulation was aired"

The Cyber Shockwave simulation game was developed in partnership with General Dynamics Advanced Information Systems, SMobile Systems, Southern Company and Georgetown University. It was created by former CIA Director General Michael Hayden and conducted by the Bipartisan Policy Center to give a glimpse of what would happen during a cyber attack and gauged whether or not the United States was prepared for it. Security agents and lawmakers played roles in the fabricated attacks. The participants did not know the scenario in advance which helped to maintain the reality of a surprise attack. If a real attack were to happen it would come without notice and lawmakers and government agencies would have to re-act immediately in a timely manner.

To prepare for a possible attack, members of The White House, Cabinet Members and National Security Agencies plan to advise President Barack Obama on possible plans of actions.

== Participants and roles ==
The list of attendees included:

1. Michael Chertoff, former Secretary of Homeland Security, as National Security Advisor
2. Fran Townsend, former White House Homeland Security Advisor, as Secretary of Homeland Security
3. J. Bennett Johnston, former Senator (D-LA), as Secretary of Energy
4. John Negroponte, former United States Deputy Secretary of State, as Secretary of State
5. Jamie Gorelick, former Deputy Attorney General, as Attorney General
6. Joe Lockhart, former White House Press Secretary, as Counselor to the President,
7. John E. McLaughlin, former Acting Director of Central Intelligence, as Director of National Intelligence
8. Stephen Friedman, former Director of the National Economic Council, as Secretary of Treasury
9. Stewart Baker, National Security Agency General Counsel, as Cyber Coordinator
10. Charles Wald, former Deputy Commander of U.S. European Command, as Secretary of Defense

== Simulation attack ==
One of the simulation attacks that was presented was a malware program planted into phones during a popular basketball game. This attack caused a disruption spanning over many mobile phones across the United States. The spyware planted on the smartphones were used through a key logger and data intercepts to funnel funds to banks overseas. Several bots appear downloading videos that shows 'The Red Army'. When someone receives the spyware, it is sent to the person's contact and the contacts will open it, spreading the malicious virus everywhere.

In addition, the cyber attack reportedly sparked a series of crises and provisions including:

- 40 million people without power in the Eastern United States
- More than 60 million cellphones out of service
- Wall Street closed for a week
- Capitol Hill leaders en route to the White House

== Results ==
The results of the Cyber ShockWave war game showed that the United States is unprepared for a cyber attack. The results highlighted the immediate dangers that are threatening the country. Finally, the game demonstrates there would be huge financial repercussions to a cyber attack.

The simulation revealed that the response speed is crucial during a cyber attack and that the planning deficiency in which the United States exhibited during the game can be extremely costly. The simulation also showed that the fast speed of an attack leaves little time to better understand certain things such as the essence of the attack, provided it were to happen, or proper recovery methods. Former Clinton press secretary Joe Lockhart added that the simulation Shockwave may cause a panic among people, but that was in fact a good thing.

According to former Secretary of Homeland Security Michael Chertoff, the United States lacks in several key aspects of Cyber security:

- Well-defined responsibilities for maintaining common situational awareness of emerging critical operational developments in cyberspace
- An effective decision-making framework below the Cabinet level for coordinating the government's response and recovery from a devastating cyber event.
- A user-friendly process to allow government cyber defenders to effectively collaborate with the private sector to take advantage of their expertise and knowledge during the response to a cyberattack

== See also ==
- Cyber Storm Exercise
- National Strategy to Secure Cyberspace
