= J. Satyanarayana =

Indian civil servant

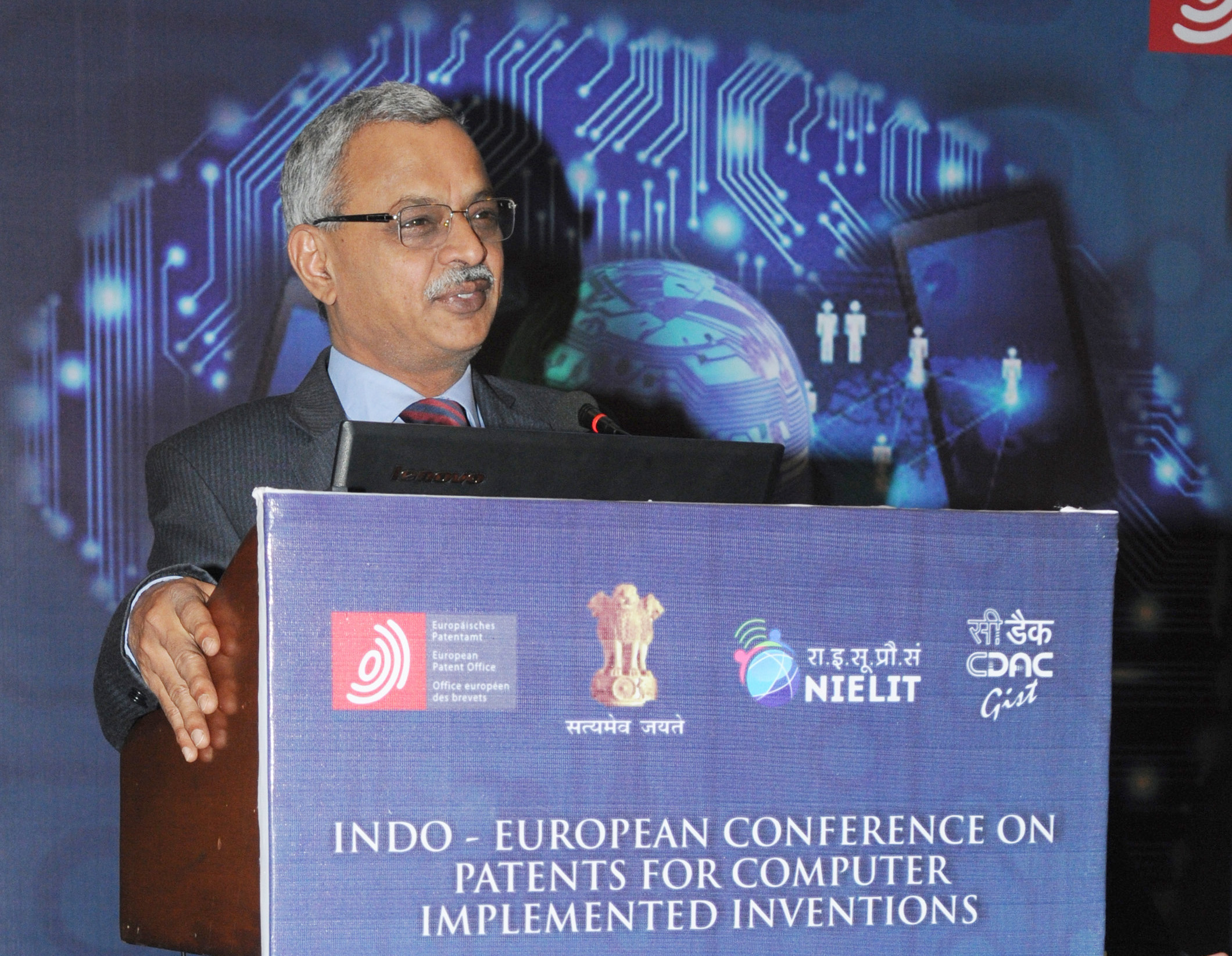

2nd Chairman of Unique Identification Authority of India
- In office 8 September 2016 – 15 April 2019
- Preceded by: Nandan Nilekani
- Succeeded by: Neelkanth Mishra

Adviser (e-Governance, Electronics and Information Technology) to Government of Andhra Pradesh
- In office 14 June 2014 – 3 September 2016

Communications and Information Technology Secretary of India
- In office 14 March 2012 – 31 April 2014

Personal details
- Born: J. Satyanarayana; 16 April 1954 (age 72) Andhra Pradesh, India
- Occupation: Retired IAS officer

J. Satyanarayana (IAST: J. Satyanārāyaṇa; born 16 April 1954) is a retired 1977 batch Indian Administrative Service officer of Andhra Pradesh cadre. Satyanarayana is the former chairman of Unique Identification Authority of India (UIDAI), the nodal agency of Government of India for implementing Aadhaar. He also served as the Communications and Information Technology Secretary of India.

== Education ==
J. Satyanarayana has a graduate degree (BSc) in Mathematics, and is a postgraduate (MSc) in Physics. Satyanarayana also holds an MBA degree from the University of Ljubljana.

== Career ==
=== As an IAS officer ===
J. Satyanarayana served in key positions for both the Union Government and the Government of Andhra Pradesh, like as the Chief Commissioner of Land Administration (CCLA) of Andhra Pradesh, Special Chief Secretary (Health, Medical and Family Welfare), Special Chief Secretary to the Chief Minister of Andhra Pradesh, Principal Secretary (Communications and Information Technology), Principal Secretary (Social Welfare), Commissioner and Inspector General (Registration), managing director of distilleries and breweries, special secretary to the Government Finance Department and as the District Magistrate and Collector of Anantapur, Karimnagar and Kurnool districts in the Andhra Pradesh Government, and the Union Communications and Information Technology Secretary in the Union Government.

J. Satyanarayana also had a stint with the National Institute for Smart Government (NISG), on deputation, as its chief executive officer (CEO), under Rule 6(2)(ii) of The Indian Administrative Service (Cadre) Rules, 1954.

==== Electronics and Information Technology Secretary ====
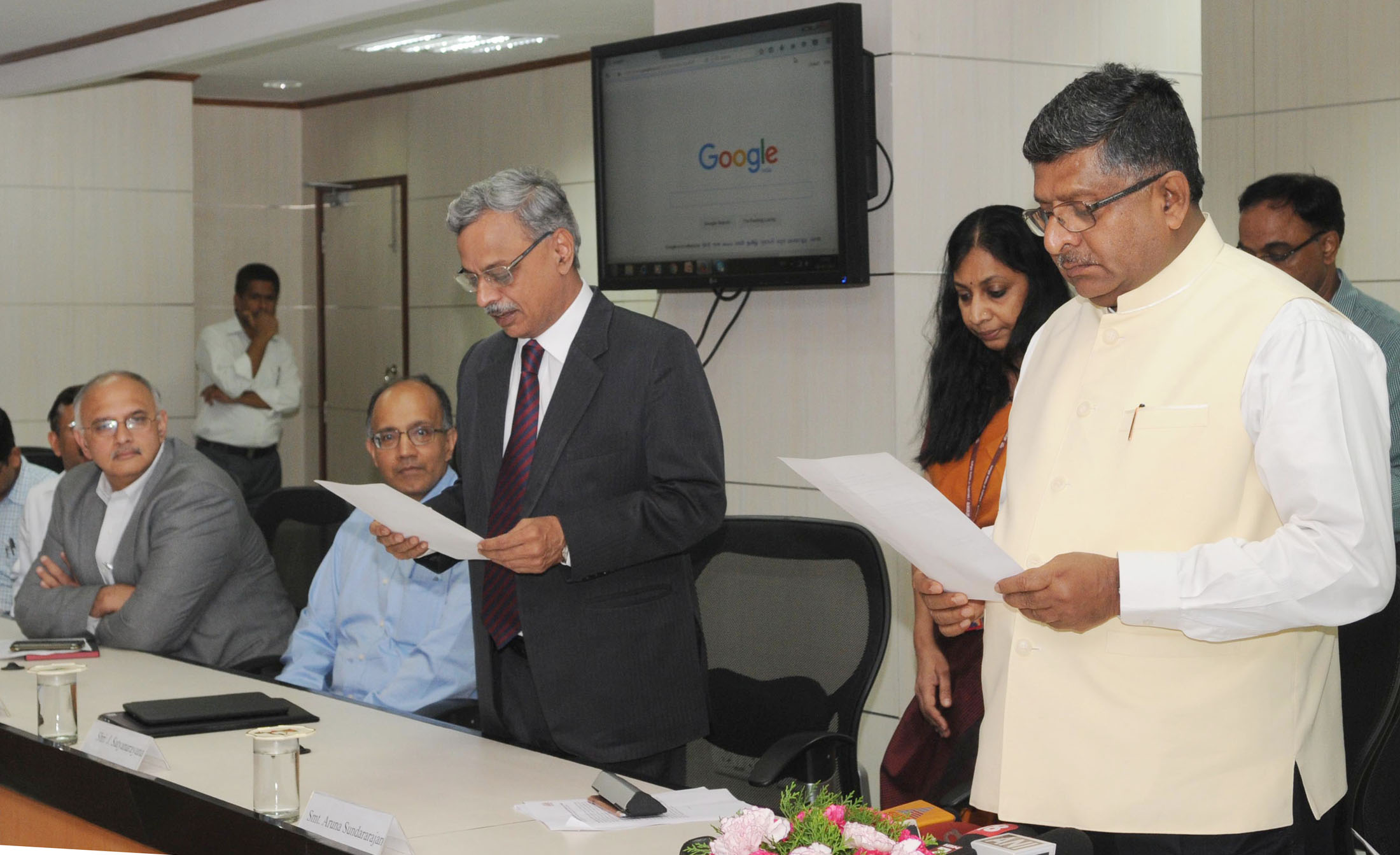
The Union Minister for Electronics & Information Technology and Law & Justice, Shri Ravi Shankar Prasad administering the oath of secrecy and office as part time Chairman of UIDAI to Shri J. Satyanarayana, in New Delhi

J. Satyanarayana was appointed as the Union Communications and Information Technology Secretary by the Appointments Committee of the Cabinet (ACC), he assumed office on 14 March 2012, demitted it and simultaneously superannuated from service on 31 April 2014.

=== Post-retirement ===
==== Adviser to Government of Andhra Pradesh ====
Post-retirement, J. Satyanarayana was appointed as the Adviser to the Government of Andhra Pradesh for e-Governance, Electronics and Information Technology, with the status of a Cabinet Minister. He tendered his resignation to the Chief Secretary of Andhra Pradesh on 3 September 2016.

==== Chairman of UIDAI ====
J. Satyanarayana was appointed as the chairman of Unique Identification Authority of India (UIDAI) by the Appointments Committee of the Cabinet (ACC), He assumed the office of Chairman on 8 September 2016 and served the office till 15 April 2019.

== Works ==
- Satyanarayana, J. (2004). e-Government: The Science of the Possible (1st ed.). Delhi: Prentice Hall India Learning. ISBN 978-81-203-2608-8.
- Satyanarayana, J. (2012). Managing Transformation: Objectives to Outcomes. Delhi: Prentice Hall India Learning. ISBN 978-81-203-4537-9.
