= Economic sanctions =

Financial penalties applied by nations

Economic sanctions or embargoes are commercial and financial penalties applied by states or institutions against states, groups, or individuals. Economic sanctions are a form of coercion that attempts to get an actor to change its behavior through disruption in economic exchange. Sanctions can be intended to compel (an attempt to change an actor's behavior) or deter (an attempt to stop an actor from certain actions), but are generally directed towards inhibiting an actor from accomplishing an undesirable task.

Sanctions can target an entire country or they can be more narrowly targeted at individuals or groups; this latter form of sanctions are sometimes called "smart sanctions". Prominent forms of economic sanctions include trade barriers, asset freezes, travel bans, arms embargoes, and restrictions on financial transactions.

The efficacy of sanctions in achieving intended goals is a subject of debate. Scholars have also considered the policy externalities of sanctions. The humanitarian consequences of country-wide sanctions have been a subject of controversy. As a consequence, since the mid-1990s, United Nations Security Council (UNSC) sanctions have tended to target individuals and entities, in contrast to the country-wide sanctions of earlier decades.

The US in particular has utilized secondary sanctions in recent years, which threaten to sanction countries for trading with a sanctioned country or government.

== History of sanctions ==
One of the most comprehensive attempts at an embargo occurred during the Napoleonic Wars of 1803–1815. Aiming to cripple the United Kingdom economically, Emperor Napoleon I of France in 1806 promulgated the Continental System – which forbade European nations from trading with the UK. In practice the French Empire could not completely enforce the embargo, which proved as harmful (if not more so) to the continental nations involved as to the British. By the time of the Hague Conventions of 1899 and 1907, diplomats and legal scholars regularly discussed using coordinated economic pressure to enforce international law. This idea was also included in reform proposals by Latin American and Chinese international lawyers in the years leading up to World War I.

=== World War I and the Interwar period ===
Sanctions in the form of blockades were prominent during World War I. Debates about implementing sanctions through international organizations, such as the League of Nations, became prominent after the end of World War I. Leaders saw sanctions as a viable alternative to war.

The League Covenant permitted the use of sanctions in five cases:

1. When Article 10 of the League Covenant is violated
2. In case of war or threat of war (Article 11)
3. When a League member does not pay an arbitration award (Article 12)
4. When a League member goes to war without submitting the dispute to the League Council or League Assembly (Articles 12–15)
5. When a non-member goes to war against a League member (Article 17)

The Abyssinia Crisis in 1935 resulted in League sanctions against Mussolini's Italy under Article 16 of the Covenant. Oil supplies, however, were not stopped, nor the Suez Canal closed to Italy, and the conquest proceeded. The sanctions were lifted in 1936 and Italy left the League in 1937.

In the lead-up to the Japanese attack on Pearl Harbor in 1941, the United States imposed severe trade restrictions on Japan to discourage further Japanese conquests in East Asia.

=== From World War II onwards ===
After World War II, the League was replaced by the more expansive United Nations (UN) in 1945. Throughout the Cold War, the use of sanctions increased gradually. After the end of the Cold War, there was a major increase in economic sanctions.

According to the Global Sanctions Data Base, there have been 1,325 sanctions in the period 1950–2022.

== Politics of sanctions ==
Economic sanctions are used as a tool of foreign policy by many governments. Economic sanctions are usually imposed by a larger country upon a smaller country for one of two reasons: either the latter is a perceived threat to the security of the former nation or that country treats its citizens unfairly. They can be used as a coercive measure for achieving particular policy goals related to trade or for humanitarian violations. Economic sanctions are used as an alternative weapon instead of going to war to achieve desired outcomes. Not all sanctions are imposed by larger countries on smaller ones: in the Threat and Imposition of Economic Sanctions (TIES) dataset, covering 1945 to 2005, about one-fifth of sanctions were imposed by senders whose combined GDP was smaller than that of the target. Such senders are more likely to face countersanctions, but this risk is substantially lower when the initial sanctions have the backing of an international organization.

The Global Sanctions Data Base categorizes nine objectives of sanctions: "changing policy, destabilizing regimes, resolving territorial conflicts, fighting terrorism, preventing war, ending war, restoring and promoting human rights, restoring and promoting democracy, and other objectives."

=== Unilateral coercive measures ===
In contrast to International sanctions, unilateral coercive measures are defined by the United Nations as "economic measures taken by one State to compel a change in the policy of another State" including "trade sanctions in the form of embargoes and the interruption of financial and investment flows between sender and target countries" and "so-called 'smart' or 'targeted' sanctions such as asset freezing and travel bans." Unilateral coercive measures have faced increasing criticism from the United Nations, with 4 December 2025 being marked as the first International Day Against Unilateral Coercive Measures. Unilateral coercive measures often lead to over-compliance, with economic actors preferring not to trade with sanctioned countries even in ways that are not explicitly penalized by the sanctions. Unilateral coercive measures are typically imposed "under the pretext of criminal responsibility" but without due process, and frequently violate various aspects of international law, such as the immunity of state property, the immunity of state officials and diplomats, and the sovereign equality of states.

=== Effectiveness of economic sanctions ===
Morgan, Syropoulos, and Yotov analyze how economic sanctions have evolved from broad trade embargoes to targeted financial and individual restrictions. They find sanctions increasingly frequent but inconsistently effective. Economic costs fall heavily on civilians, trade patterns shift toward neutral countries, and enforcement complexity rises. The authors conclude sanctions remain politically appealing yet economically blunt instruments whose success depends on coordination, credible goals, and minimizing humanitarian fallout.

Attia finds that sanctions serve more as symbolic or political devices than as costly coercive instruments.

According to a study by Neuenkirch and Neumeier, UN economic sanctions had a statistically significant impact on targeted states by reducing their GDP growth by an average of 2.3–3.5 percent per year – and more than 5 percent per year in the case of comprehensive UN embargoes – with the negative effects typically persisting for a period of ten years. By contrast, unilateral US sanctions had a considerably smaller impact on GDP growth, restricting it by 0.5–0.9 percent per year, with an average duration of seven years.

Oryoie, A. R. demonstrates that economic sanctions result in welfare losses across all income groups in Iran, with wealthier groups suffering greater losses compared to poorer groups.

Imposing sanctions on an opponent also affects the economy of the imposing country to a degree. If import restrictions are promulgated, consumers in the imposing country may have restricted choices of goods. If export restrictions are imposed or if sanctions prohibit companies in the imposing country from trading with the target country, the imposing country may lose markets and investment opportunities to competing countries.

Hufbauer, Schott, and Elliot (2008) argue that regime change is the most frequent foreign-policy objective of economic sanctions, accounting for just over 39 percent of cases of their imposition. Hufbauer et al. found that 34 percent of the cases studied were successful. However, when Robert A. Pape examined their study, he found that only 5 of their reported 40 successes were actually effective, reducing the success rate to 4 percent. In either case, the difficulty and unexpected nuances of measuring the actual success of sanctions in relation to their goals are both increasingly apparent and still under debate. In other words, it is difficult to determine why a regime or country changes (i.e., whether it was the sanction or inherent instability) and doubly so to measure the full political effect of a given action.

Offering an explanation as to why sanctions are still imposed even when they may be marginally effective, British diplomat Jeremy Greenstock suggests sanctions are popular not because they are known to be effective, but because "there is nothing else [to do] between words and military action if you want to bring pressure upon a government". Critics of sanctions like Belgian jurist Marc Bossuyt argue that in nondemocratic regimes, the extent to which this affects political outcomes is contested, because by definition such regimes do not respond as strongly to the popular will.

A strong connection has been found between the effectiveness of sanctions and the size of veto players in a government. Veto players represent individual or collective actors whose agreement is required for a change of the status quo, for example, parties in a coalition, or the legislature's check on presidential powers. When sanctions are imposed on a country, it can try to mitigate them by adjusting its economic policy. The size of the veto players determines how many constraints the government will face when trying to change status quo policies, and the larger the size of the veto players, the more difficult it is to find support for new policies, thus making the sanctions more effective.

Francesco Giumelli writes that the "set of sanctions ... that many observers would be likely to consider the most persuasive (and effective)", namely, UN sanctions against "central bank assets and sovereign wealth funds", are "of all the types of measures applied ... the one least frequently used". Giumelli also distinguishes between sanctions against international terrorists, in which "the nature of the request is not as important as the constraining aspect", and sanctions imposed in connection with "post-conflict scenarios", which should "include flexible demands and the potential for adaptation if the situation changes".

Economic sanctions can be used for achieving domestic and international purposes.

Foreign aid suspensions are typically considered as a type of economic sanctions. Previously mentioned work by Hufbauer, Schott, Elliot, and Oegg is a prominent example. Claas Mertens finds that "suspending aid is more effective than adopting economic sanctions because (1) aid suspensions are economically beneficial for the adopting state, while sanctions are costly, (2) aid suspensions directly affect the targeted government's budget, (3) market forces undermine sanctions but not aid suspensions, and (4) aid suspensions are less likely to spark adverse behavioral reactions. [...] The findings suggest that economic sanctions are less effective than previously thought and that large donor states have a higher chance of achieving political goals through economic coercion."

=== Criticism ===
Sanctions have been criticized on humanitarian grounds, as they negatively impact a nation's economy and can also cause collateral damage on ordinary citizens. Peksen implies that sanctions can degenerate human rights in the target country. Some policy analysts believe that imposing trade restrictions only serves to hurt ordinary people as opposed to government elites, and others have likened the practice to siege warfare. The United Nations Security Council (UNSC) has generally refrained from imposing comprehensive sanctions since the mid-1990s, in part due to the controversy over the efficacy and civilian harms attributed to the sanctions against Iraq. Sanctions can have unintended consequences.

According to a 2025 article in The Lancet Global Health, economic sanctions imposed by the United States and the European Union are associated with 38 million deaths from 1970 to 2021. In their Foreign Affairs article, "Sanctions of Mass Destruction," scholars John Mueller and Karl Mueller argue that economic sanctions have caused more deaths than all biological, chemical, and nuclear weapons throughout history, including the atomic bombings of Hiroshima and Nagasaki.

=== Smart Sanctions ===
One of the most popular suggestions to combat the humanitarian issues that arise from sanctions is the concept of "smart sanctions", and a lot of research has been done on this concept also known as targeted sanctions. The term "smart sanctions" refers to measures like asset freezes, travel bans, and arms embargoes that aim to target responsible parties like political leaders and elites with the goal of avoiding causing widespread collateral damage to innocent civilians and neighboring nations.

Though there has been enthusiasm about the concept, as of 2016, the Targeted Sanctions Consortium (TSC) found that targeted sanctions only result in policy goals being met 22 percent of the time.

Smart Sanctions have also not been totally successful in avoiding civilian harm or unintended consequences. For example, arms embargoes can impact the self-defense efforts of those under attack, aviation bans can affect a nation's transportation sector and the jobs of civilians associated with them, and financial sanctions targeting individuals raise due process issues. One example of smart sanctions in practice can be seen with sanctions imposed by the United States on the Russian Federation following the latter's 2014 annexation of Crimea, which were intended to exert pressure on Russia's financial sector. The sanctions resulted in American credit card companies Visa and Mastercard suspending all transactions of sanctioned Russian banks, effectively canceling the credit cards of ordinary Russian consumers. In addition, the suspension of the SWIFT payment system in Russia, following its 2022 invasion of Ukraine, led to the widespread adoption of its own domestic payment system and decreased reliance on Western banking.

== Sanctions evasion and shadow fleets ==
Economic sanctions, largely on oil exporters, have led to the growth of so-called dark and shadow fleets of tankers that move sanctioned crude and refined products outside regular monitoring and service networks. The terms are used for tankers that operate at the limits of, or outside, conventional monitoring and regulatory frameworks, typically in order to move sanctioned or high-risk oil cargoes. These fleets are most closely associated with Russian crude exports after 2022, but similar patterns have been documented in trades involving Iran, Venezuela and North Korea. Since 2025, Venezuelan shadow vessels have also drawn increased attention, due to the Trump administration's efforts to enforce economic sanctions.

In the sanctions literature, “dark fleet” is used for vessels that hide their identity or activities to evade regulations and monitoring. These tankers may change flag and name frequently, use complex ownership chains and front companies, falsify documentation, and sail with Automatic Identification System (AIS) transponders switched off for long periods. This type of opaque structure was first mapped in detail in a 2019 case where United States authorities seized a North Korean vessel operating through layered ownership in several jurisdictions.

Alongside these are “grey fleets”, which keep AIS switched on but often manipulate the data, for example by misreporting destinations or cargoes. Grey fleet operators exploit gaps and inconsistencies in national and international rules so they appear formally compliant while bypassing sanctions in practice. They have become central to moving Russian oil to non-sanctioning buyers such as China, India and Türkiye.

Many recent studies use “Russian shadow fleet” as an umbrella term for both dark- and grey-fleet tankers that carry Russian oil while concealing their links to Russia, operating without insurance from International Group protection and indemnity clubs, and being owned through companies registered outside the European Union, the G7 and allied states. This fleet is largely composed of older Aframax and Suezmax tankers purchased out of mainstream fleets and re-flagged to open registries or small coastal and island states, as Western firms have withdrawn from Russian trades.

Iran has also increasingly operated a so-called shadow fleet amid US sanctions imposed on its oil industry amid the 2026 Iran War and the partial closure of the Strait of Hormuz.

=== Economic logic and incentives ===
The emergence of a shadow fleet fits standard economic theories of sanctions and black markets. Classical work by Boulding and Becker argued that price caps, quotas and embargoes on profitable goods tend to generate illicit markets when the expected net return from evasion exceeds the return available under the sanctioned regime. In this framework, sanctions create a wedge between the world price and the effective price received by the exporter. If exporters can recover part of that wedge by paying higher logistics and risk costs, they have a clear incentive to do so.

Recent economic analyses apply this logic to the Russian oil sanctions. Hilgenstock et al. and Stockbruegger describe how the post-2022 price-cap regime ties access to key maritime services such as shipping finance, insurance and brokerage to certified compliance with the cap. The intention was to keep Russian barrels on the market, while forcing Russia to sell at a discount and absorb higher transaction costs. In practice, this architecture created strong substitution incentives. As coalition firms tightened due diligence or withdrew from Russian cargoes, Russia and associated traders shifted to non-coalition channels: older hulls held via opaque ownership, wider use of flags of convenience, non-International Group insurance or unclear financial guarantees, more ship-to-ship transfers and intermittent AIS darkness or identity manipulation.

Two margins matter. First, the price margin. Monitoring by think-tanks and central banks reports that by late 2023 many Russian crude cargoes were selling above the nominal cap, with the incidence of sanctions showing up, instead, in higher bundled freight and insurance charges, and in buyer discounts relative to benchmark grades. Free-on-board prices stayed within formal limits, but total delivered prices and margins shifted through opaque service pricing.

Second, the capacity margin. Cardoso et al. model evasion capacity – the size of the shadow fleet and its supporting services – as a choice variable. In their calibrated model, Russia can increase the share of exports sold outside coalition services by “investing” in a larger shadow fleet and its enablers. Where evasion capacity can expand at reasonable cost, tightening the cap or moving towards bans does not necessarily reduce Russian revenue; instead, trade re-routes through the shadow fleet and world prices adjust. In this setting, caps remain only partially effective unless policy also constrains the growth or utilisation of evasion capacity.

On the producer side, Grebennikov describes how Russia has adjusted its fiscal rules by applying a fixed Urals discount in tax calculations. This cushions budget revenue against volatility in reported export prices and implicitly recognises the higher supply-chain and intermediation costs that accompany sanctions evasion. Poussenkova et al. link these fiscal adjustments to a broader re-routing of exports towards India and China, which gain bargaining power as European buyers exit, and competition among service providers thins.

The economic literature is clear on the direction of these incentives but weaker on their exact magnitude. Much early empirical work relies on administrative export prices and customs data with patchy coverage and varying definitions, and there is almost no micro-level data on the pricing and performance of non-International Group insurance contracts. Assertions that many vessels are “uninsured” often mean only that they lack IG cover; they may still be backed by alternative guarantees whose quality is hard to verify.

=== Evolution of sanctions and policy response ===
Work on the Russian shadow fleet illustrates how sanctions design tends to evolve over time. Rather than a single, static measure, sanctioning coalitions usually adjust instruments in response to evasion and to wider economic effects.

In the Russian case, early measures focused on a price cap that was tied to access to maritime services such as finance, insurance and brokering. The intention was to keep oil supplies on the market while compressing Russian revenue. As evidence accumulated that a growing share of exports was moving through shadow-fleet tankers and non-coalition service providers, the policy mix became progressively tighter. Governments introduced more demanding attestation requirements, began listing specific vessels and facilitators, stepped up insurance document checks at key maritime chokepoints, and restricted suspicious sales of older hulls into opaque ownership structures. By 2024–2025, the United States, the United Kingdom and the European Union had also adopted measures directly targeting logistics companies, energy traders and tankers believed to be involved in systematic evasion, while formally maintaining the cap framework.

Economic modelling of these developments uses the shadow fleet as an example of how sanctions and evasion capacity interact. Cardoso et al. show that making a cap stricter, or replacing it with broader prohibitions, does not automatically reduce the target’s income if evasion can expand at relatively low cost. In such settings, exporters and buyers re-route trade through alternative fleets and service networks, and some of the intended revenue loss is offset by higher world prices. The models therefore stress that the effectiveness of sanctions depends not only on the level of the cap or the breadth of legal restrictions, but also on policies that raise the cost of evasion, for example by limiting access to recognised insurance and bunkering services for high-risk vessels or by tightening controls on ship sales into opaque structures.

From the perspective of the wider sanctions literature, this case underlines three general points. First, sanctions are often implemented as a sequence of measures that respond to observed loopholes rather than as a fully designed regime from the outset. Second, the line between price-based tools and de facto bans can blur over time as senders add restrictions on services and specific actors. Third, policy changes that look tougher on paper may have limited impact if they do not address the parallel networks that sanctions themselves have helped to create.

=== Externalities and the blue-economy debate ===
Policy essays on the shadow fleet stress externalities rather than just revenue effects. Both Stockbruegger and the Poussenkova et al. argue that the growth of an ageing, lightly regulated tanker pool with opaque ownership and non-standard insurance increases environmental and safety risks borne by coastal states and seafarers. In their view, the re-routing and de-risking of sanctioned trade by coalition firms pushes expected social costs onto jurisdictions and actors who did not choose the sanctions.

Parlov and Sverdrup take a similar line from a legal perspective, claiming that the combination of flags of convenience, reduced inspections and unclear liability undermines more than five decades of work to build a coherent international regime for tanker safety, pollution control and victim compensation. Braw and others estimate that a major spill involving a shadow-fleet tanker in European waters could generate clean-up and compensation costs in the order of billions of US dollars, although these figures are scenario-based rather than grounded in observed accident data.

So far, these arguments are plausible but not yet backed by detailed micro-evidence. No study provides systematic information on premium levels, deductibles, exclusions or claims outcomes under non-IG cover. Without such data, it is impossible to say how much of the so-called “evasion wedge” is due to weak insurance and liability versus pure logistics, buyer power or regulatory arbitrage.

=== International law and maritime sanctions enforcement ===
Most legal discussion of sanctions evasion at sea centres on how shadow-fleet practices interact with the law of the sea. The basic framework is the United Nations Convention on the Law of the Sea (UNCLOS) and International Maritime Organization (IMO) instruments such as MARPOL. These place primary responsibility for safety and pollution control on flag states, while port states enforce rules when vessels call at their ports.

Shadow-fleet operators are described as exploiting this division by using flags of convenience with weak enforcement and by avoiding ports in jurisdictions that apply strict port-state control. Instead, they rely on ship-to-ship transfers on the high seas or in EEZs, where traditional port-state tools are harder to use.

A key question is how far coastal states can act inside their EEZs to support sanctions. Suggested measures include applying existing IMO rules on ship-to-ship transfers through documentation and insurance checks, designating monitored transfer zones, and using UNCLOS obligations on flag states to press registries that accept large numbers of high-risk tankers. A minority of authors argue for a stricter reading of the Convention’s requirement of a “genuine link” between a flag state and its vessels, but attempts to turn this into a practical tool have not succeeded.

The literature generally concludes that these options remain largely theoretical. There is little evidence that coastal states have yet applied them systematically to shadow-fleet operations, so most work maps what states could do in principle rather than documenting state practice in enforcing sanctions at sea.

=== Gaps and ongoing debates ===
Across legal, economic, environmental and geopolitical work, the literature on sanctions evasion via shadow fleets is still at an early stage. Authors agree that the fleets pose a structural challenge to sanctions enforcement and maritime governance, but empirical knowledge is fragmented.

First, there is a basic data deficit. The fleets operate deliberately in opaque ways, which hampers measurement. Legal analyses of potential coastal-state responses under the United Nations Convention on the Law of the Sea – for example, using article 211 paragraph 5 to impose documentation and insurance requirements for ship-to-ship transfers in the exclusive economic zone – remain almost entirely doctrinal. There is no solid evidence that states have tried these measures in a sustained way, so their feasibility is unknown. Economic studies repeatedly note the absence of reliable micro-data on insurance, ownership chains and claims, and rely instead on partial customs data and indicative shipping information.

Second, there is a geographical bias. Most detailed work focuses on Europe, the Baltic Sea and North Atlantic routes, where political interest and media scrutiny are strongest. Yet key operational hubs for the shadow fleet lie elsewhere: ship-to-ship transfer zones in the eastern Mediterranean, the Arabian Sea and Southeast Asia, permissive port-state regimes in parts of West Africa and the South Atlantic, and final discharge ports in Asia and the Middle East. Bai et al. and Poussenkova et al. argue that these permissive corridors effectively set the floor for global evasion costs and thus for the true effectiveness of sanctions, but they remain under-analysed.

Third, there is almost no systematic work on seafarers’ rights and labour conditions in the shadow fleet, despite indications that many vessels are old, heavily worked and registered under flags with weak labour oversight. Existing studies treat the fleet mainly as an instrument of state strategy or corporate evasion rather than as a workplace embedded in global labour markets. International labour law and human-rights obligations are mentioned as potential levers but not explored in detail.

Finally, the broader geopolitical implications are only partially mapped. Current analyses show how the shadow fleet mitigates Western sanctions and increases Russia’s ability to re-orient exports towards non-coalition buyers, but there is little systematic work on how this reshapes bargaining power, long-term energy relationships or the authority of institutions such as the International Maritime Organization. The risk that aggressive secondary sanctions on shadow-fleet actors could generate collateral damage for developing countries, or accelerate broader shifts in trade and alliance patterns, is noted but not well quantified.

Taken together, existing work on sanctions and the shadow fleet shows that targets respond to economic pressure by building alternative logistics and financial networks, and that these networks create new regulatory and welfare problems of their own. The basic mechanisms are well understood in theory. The scale, distribution and long-term implications are not.

== Implications for businesses ==
There is an importance, especially with relation to financial loss, for companies to be aware of embargoes that apply to their intended export or import destinations. Properly preparing products for trade, sometimes referred to as an embargo check, is a difficult and timely process for both importers and exporters.

There are many steps that must be taken to ensure that a business entity does not accrue unwanted fines, taxes, or other punitive measures. Common examples of embargo checks include referencing embargo lists, cancelling transactions, and ensuring the validity of a trade entity.

This process can become very complicated, especially for countries with changing embargoes. Before better tools became available, many companies relied on spreadsheets and manual processes to keep track of compliance issues. Today, there are software based solutions that automatically handle sanctions and other complications with trade.

== Examples ==
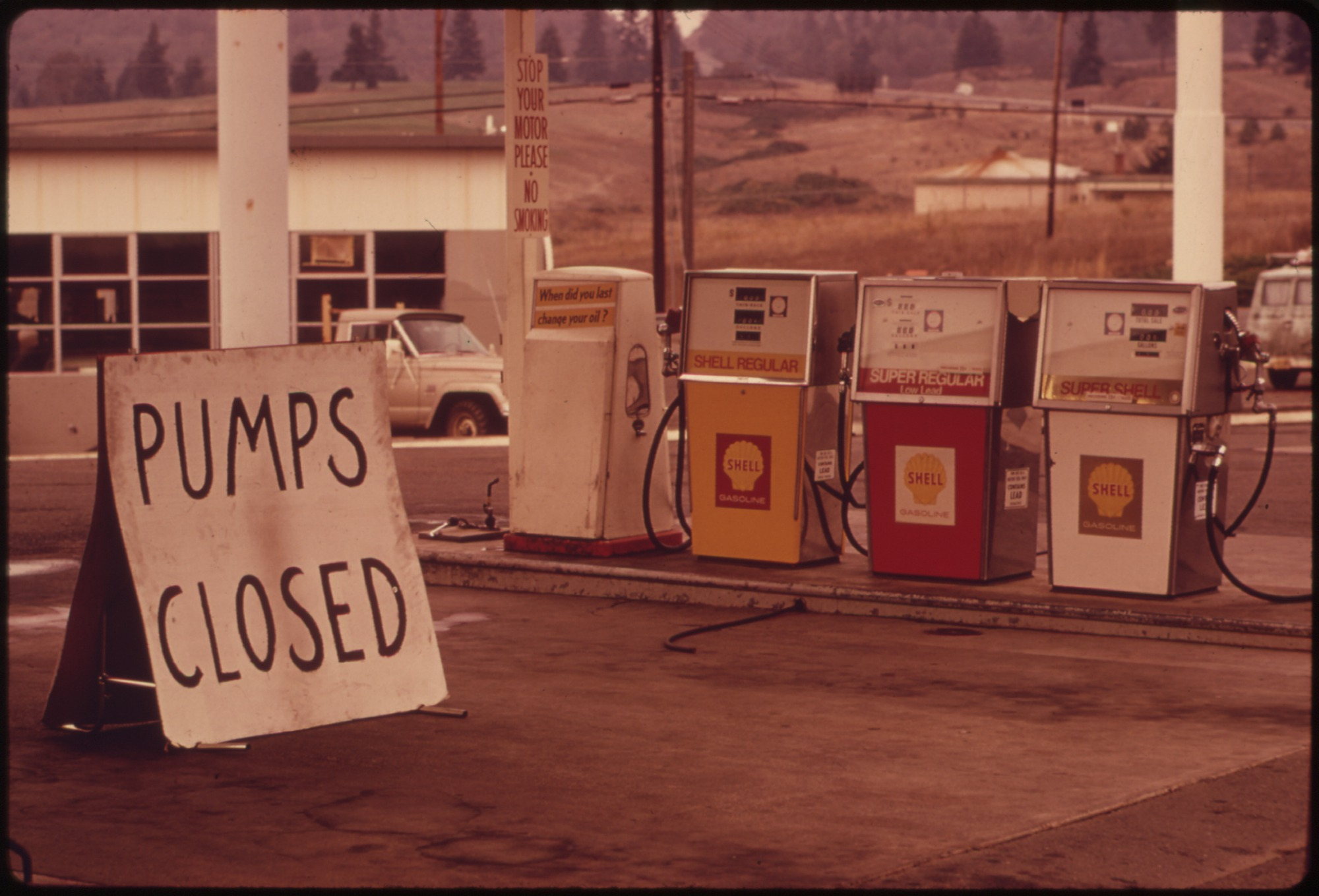
An undersupplied US gasoline station, closed during the oil embargo in 1973

=== United States sanctions ===
==== US Embargo Act of 1807 ====
The United States Embargo of 1807 involved a series of laws passed by the US Congress (1806–1808) during the second term of President Thomas Jefferson. Britain and France were engaged in the War of the Fourth Coalition; the US wanted to remain neutral and to trade with both sides, but both countries objected to American trade with the other. American policy aimed to use the new laws to avoid war and to force both France and Britain to respect American rights. The embargo failed to achieve its aims, and Jefferson repealed the legislation in March 1809.

==== US embargo of Cuba ====
The United States embargo against Cuba began on 14 March 1958, during the overthrow of dictator Fulgencio Batista by Fidel Castro during the Cuban Revolution. At first, the embargo applied only to arms sales; however, it later expanded to include other imports, eventually extending to almost all trade on 7 February 1962. Referred to by Cuba as "el bloqueo" (the blockade), the US embargo on Cuba remains as of 2022 one of the longest-standing embargoes in modern history. Few of the United States' allies embraced the embargo, and many have argued it has been ineffective in changing Cuban government behavior. While taking some steps to allow limited economic exchanges with Cuba, American President Barack Obama nevertheless reaffirmed the policy in 2011, stating that without the granting of improved human rights and freedoms by Cuba's current government, the embargo remains "in the national interest of the United States".

=== Russian sanctions ===
Russia has been known to use economic sanctions to achieve its political goals. Russia's focus has been primarily on implementing sanctions against the pro-Western governments of former Soviet Union states. The Kremlin's aim is particularly on states that aspire to join the European Union and NATO, such as Ukraine, Moldova, and Georgia. Russia has enacted a law, the Dima Yakovlev Law, that defines sanctions against US citizens involved in "violations of the human rights and freedoms of Russian citizens". It lists US citizens who are banned from entering Russia.

==== Russia sanctions on Ukraine ====
Viktor Yushchenko, the third president of Ukraine who was elected in 2003, lobbied during his term to gain admission to NATO and the EU. Soon after Yushchenko entered office, Russia demanded Kyiv pay the same rate that it charged Western European states. This quadrupled Ukraine's energy bill overnight. Russia subsequently cut off the supply of natural gas in 2006, causing significant harm to the Ukrainian and Russian economies. As the Ukrainian economy began to struggle, Yushchenko's approval ratings dropped significantly; reaching the single digits by the 2010 election; Viktor Yanukovych, who was more supportive of Moscow won the election in 2010 to become the fourth president of Ukraine. After his election, gas prices were reduced substantially.

==== Russian sanctions on Georgia ====
The Rose Revolution in Georgia brought Mikheil Saakashvili to power as the third president of the country. Saakashvili wanted to bring Georgia into NATO and the EU and was a strong supporter of the US-led war in Iraq and Afghanistan. Russia would soon implement a number of different sanctions on Georgia, including natural gas price raises through Gazprom and wider trade sanctions that impacted the Georgian economy, particularly Georgian exports of wine, citrus fruits, and mineral water. In 2006, Russia banned all imports from Georgia which was able to deal a significant blow to the Georgian economy. Russia also expelled nearly 2,300 Georgians who worked within its borders.

=== United Nations sanctions ===
The United Nations issues sanctions by consent of the United Nations Security Council (UNSC) and/or General Assembly in response to major international events, receiving authority to do so under Article 41 of Chapter VII of the United Nations Charter. The nature of these sanctions may vary, and include financial, trade, or weaponry restrictions. Motivations can also vary, ranging from humanitarian and environmental concerns to efforts to halt nuclear proliferation. Over two dozen sanctions measures have been implemented by the United Nations since its founding in 1945.

Most UNSC sanctions since the mid-1990s have targeted individuals and entities rather than entire governments, a change from the comprehensive trade sanctions of earlier decades. For example, the UNSC maintains lists of individuals indicted for crimes or linked to international terrorism, which raises novel legal questions regarding due process. According to a dataset covering the years 1991 to 2013, 95% of UNSC sanction regimes included "sectoral bans" on aviation and/or the import (or export) of arms or raw materials, 75% included "individual/group" sanctions such as asset freezes or restrictions on travel, and just 10% targeted national finances or included measures against central banks, sovereign wealth funds, or foreign investment. The most frequently used UNSC sanction documented in the dataset is an embargo against imported weapons, which applied in 87% of all cases and was directed against non-state actors more often than against governments. Targeted sanctions regimes may contain hundreds of names, a handful, or none at all.

==== Sanctions on Somalia, 1992 ====
The UN implemented sanctions against Somalia beginning in April 1992, after the overthrow of the Siad Barre regime in 1991 during the Somali Civil War. UNSC Resolution 751 forbade members to sell, finance, or transfer any military equipment to Somalia.

==== Sanctions on North Korea, 2006 ====
The UNSC passed Resolution 1718 in 2006 in response to a nuclear test that the Democratic People's Republic of Korea (DPRK) conducted in violation of the Treaty on Non-Proliferation of Nuclear Weapons. The resolution banned the sale of military and luxury goods and froze government assets. Since then, the UN has passed multiple resolutions subsequently expanding sanctions on North Korea. Resolution 2270 from 2016 placed restrictions on transport personnel and vehicles employed by North Korea while also restricting the sale of natural resources and fuel for aircraft.

The efficacy of such sanctions has been questioned in light of continued nuclear tests by North Korea in the decade following the 2006 resolution. Professor William Brown of Georgetown University argued that "sanctions don't have much of an impact on an economy that has been essentially bankrupt for a generation".

==== Sanctions on Libya ====
On 26 February 2011, the UNSC issued an arms embargo against the Libya through Security Council Resolution 1970 in response to humanitarian abuses occurring in the First Libyan Civil War. The embargo was later extended to mid-2018. Under the embargo, Libya has suffered severe inflation because of increased dependence on the private sector to import goods. The sanctions caused large cuts to health and education, which caused social conditions to decrease. Even though the sanctions were in response to human rights, their effects were limited.

==== Sanction on the Central African Republic ====
In 2013 the UN decreed an arms embargo against the CAR. The arms embargo was established in the context of an intercommunity conflict between the Séléka rebels, with a Muslim majority, and the predominantly Christian militias. to fight back. Raised UN Security Council lifts arms embargo on CAR on 1 August 2024.

==== Sanctions on apartheid South Africa ====
In effort to punish South Africa for its policies of apartheid, the United Nations General Assembly adopted a voluntary international oil-embargo against South Africa on 20 November 1987; that embargo had the support of 130 countries. South Africa, in response, expanded its Sasol production of synthetic crude.

All United Nations sanctions on South Africa ended over the Negotiations to end Apartheid, Resolution 919 and the 1994 South African elections, in which Nelson Mandela was elected as the first post-Apartheid president. When asked in 1993 if economic sanctions had helped end apartheid, Mandela replied "Oh, there is no doubt."

=== Other multilateral sanctions ===
The United States, Britain, the Republic of China and the Netherlands imposed sanctions against Japan in 1940–1941 in response to its expansionism. Deprived of access to vital oil, iron-ore and steel supplies, Japan started planning for military action to seize the resource-rich Dutch East Indies, which required a preemptive attack on Pearl Harbor, triggering the American entry into the Pacific War.

In 1973–1974, OAPEC instigated the 1973 oil crisis through its oil embargo against the United States and other industrialized nations that supported Israel in the Yom Kippur War. The results included a sharp rise in oil prices and in OPEC revenues, an emergency period of energy rationing, a global economic recession, large-scale conservation efforts, and long-lasting shifts toward natural gas, ethanol, nuclear and other alternative energy sources. Israel continued to receive Western support, however.

In 2010, the European Union made the decision to sanction Iran due to their involvement in their nuclear program. Theresa Papademetriou states the exact restrictions the EU posed on Iran, "prohibition on the provision of insurance, increased restrictions on and notifications needed for transfers of funds to and from Iran, restrictions on the supply of or traffic in technology and equipment to be used in certain oil and gas fields and prohibition of investment in such fields, expansion of the list of goods and technology whose supply to Iran is either subject to prior authorization or is completely banned and new visa restrictions." Also in 2010, the UN Council imposed sanctions on Iran due to their involvement in their nuclear program. These sanctions banned Iran from carrying out tests on their nuclear weapons and imposed an embargo on the transfer of weapons into the country. These sanctions resulted in drastic macroeconomic downturns for the Iranian economy including volatility in GDP, increase in unemployment, and increase in inflation.

== Current sanctions ==
=== By targeted country ===
List of sanctioned countries (the below is not an exhaustive list):

- Afghanistan sanctions by the US
- Turkish–Azeri blockade against Armenia, enacted in 1988 is an ongoing transportation and economic embargo which primarily aims at curbing the Karabakh movement. Other aims include having Armenia abandon pursuit of international recognition of Turkey's genocide in Western Armenia, Armenia's ratification of the 1921 borders inherited from the Kemalist-Soviet Treaty of Kars, (Note: Following Turkey's invasion of Armenia in 1920, the Democratic Republic of Armenia signed the Treaty of Alexandropol under duress, effectively accepting Turkish territorial demands. However, the treaty was never ratified by an independent post-Soviet Armenia.) and the establishment of an extraterritorial corridor through Armenian territory.
- China by the EU and the US. Sanctions made on arms embargo, enacted in response to the Tiananmen Square protests of 1989
  - European Union arms embargo on the People's Republic of China
  - Hong Kong, enacted in response to the National Security Law
- Cuban embargoes by the US. It covers arms, consumer goods and financial assets, enacted in 1958
- EU, US, Australia, Canada and Norway by Russia since August 2014 on beef, pork, fruit and vegetable produce, poultry, fish, cheese, milk and dairy items. On 13 August 2015, the embargo was expanded to include Albania, Montenegro, Iceland, and Liechtenstein
- Gaza Strip by Israel since 2001, under blockade since 2007 supposedly due to the large number of illicit arms traffic used to wage war
- Indonesia by Australia on live cattle due to the alleged cruel slaughter methods in Indonesia
- Iran sanctions by the US and its allies, notably by barring nuclear, missile and many military exports to Iran and target investments in: oil, gas and petrochemicals, exports of refined petroleum products, banks, insurance, financial institutions, and shipping. Enacted 1979, increased through the following years and reached its tightest point in 2010. In April 2019 the US threatened to sanction countries that continued to buy oil from Iran after an initial six-month waiver announced in November 2018 had expired. According to the BBC, US sanctions against Iran "have led to a sharp downturn in Iran's economy, pushing the value of its currency to record lows, quadrupling its annual inflation rate, driving away foreign investors, and triggering protests". These sanctions have taken a toll on humanitarian concerns.
- Mali by the UNSC in relation to the spiraling security situation and hostilities in breach of the Agreement on Peace and Reconciliation in 2017
- Myanmar sanctions by the EU. Sanctions were imposed against Myanmar due to the worsening state of democracy and human rights infringements
- Nicaragua by the UK. Sanctions imposed in 2020 to push the government to respect democratic principles and legal institutions
- North Korean sanctions:
  - international sanctions imposed on North Korea since the Korean War of 1950–1953 eased under the Sunshine Policy of South Korean President Kim Dae Jung and of US President Bill Clinton. but tightened again in 2010
  - by the UN, US and EU on luxury goods (and arms) enacted 2006
  - United Nations Security Council Resolution 1718 (2006) – a reaction to the DPRK's claim of a nuclear test
- Russian sanctions:
  - by the US. On 2 August 2017, President Donald Trump signed into law the Countering America's Adversaries Through Sanctions Act that grouped together sanctions against Russia, Iran and North Korea
  - by the EU. In March 2021, Reuters reported that the EU has placed immediate sanctions on both Chechnya and Russia—due to ongoing government sponsored and backed violence against LGBTIQ+ individuals
  - international sanctions were also implemented in response to the Russo-Ukrainian War that started in 2014
  - international sanctions during the 2022 Russian invasion of Ukraine
- Somalia by the West. Sanctions imposed since 2010, were due to the human rights abuses and anti-piracy measures and concerns.
- Sudan by the US in 1997
- Syrian sanctions by the EU and the US on arms and imports of oil
- Turkish Republic of Northern Cyprus embargo by the UN on consumer goods, enacted since 1994
- Venezuelan sanctions by the US and its allies since 2015. An arms embargo and the selling of assets were banned due to human rights violations, high government corruption, links with drug cartels and electoral rigging in the 2018 Venezuelan presidential elections. Sanctions imposed by Canada since 2017, and since 2018 by Mexico, Panama and Switzerland

=== By targeted individuals ===
- List of individuals sanctioned during the Venezuelan crisis
- List of people and organizations sanctioned during the Russo-Ukrainian War
- List of people and organizations sanctioned in relation to human rights violations in Belarus
- United Nations sanction imposed by UN Security Council Resolution 1267 in 1999 against all Al-Qaida- and Taliban-associated individuals. The cornerstone of the sanction is a consolidated list of persons maintained by the Security Council. All nations are obliged to freeze bank accounts and other financial instruments controlled by or used for the benefit of anyone on the list.

=== By sanctioning country or organization ===
- Australia currently sanctions 9 countries
- Chinese sanctions
  - Chinese restrictions on rare metals exports
- India sanctions
- United Kingdom currently has sanctions on 27 countries
- United Nations has since 1966 established 30 sanctions regimes to countries (such as Southern Rhodesia, South Africa, Yugoslavia and more) and to organizations (such as ISIL, al-Qaida and the Taliban)
- United States sanctions and United States embargoes
  - 2002 United States steel tariff was placed by the United States on steel to protect its industry from foreign producers such as China and Russia. The World Trade Organization ruled that the tariffs were illegal. The European Union threatened retaliatory tariffs on a range of US goods that would mainly affect swing states. The US government then removed the steel tariffs in early 2004.

=== By targeted activity ===
- In response to cyber-attacks on 1 April 2015, President Obama issued an Executive Order establishing the first-ever economic sanctions. The Executive Order was intended to impact individuals and entities ("designees") responsible for cyber-attacks that threaten the national security, foreign policy, economic health, or financial stability of the US. Specifically, the Executive Order authorized the Treasury Department to freeze the assets of designees. The European Union implemented their first targeted financial sanctions regarding cyber activity in 2020.
- In response to intelligence analysis alleging Russian hacking and interference with the 2016 US elections, President Obama expanded presidential authority to sanction in response to cyber activity that threatens democratic elections. Given that the original order was intended to protect critical infrastructure, it can be argued that the election process should have been included in the original order.

=== Bilateral trade disputes ===
- Vietnam as a result of capitalist influences over the 1990s and having imposed sanctions against Cambodia, is accepting of sanctions disposed with accountability.
- Brazil introduced sanctions against the US in March 2010. These sanctions were placed because the US government was paying cotton farmers for their products against World Trade Organization rules. The sanctions cover cotton, as well as cars, chewing gum, fruit, and vegetable products. The WTO is currently supervising talks between the states to remove the sanctions.

== Former sanctions ==
- Comecon nations (CoCom export controls) by the Western Bloc
- Georgian and Moldovan import ban by Russia on agricultural products, wine and mineral water (2006–2013)
- Iraqi sanctions by the US (1990–2003)
- Israeli boycott by Arab nations
- Italy by the League of Nations in 1935 after the Italian invasion of Abyssinia
- Japan (ABCD line) by the US, UK, China and the Netherlands in 1940 to discourage militarism
- Libya by the UN in 2011 due to mass killings of Libyan protesters/rebels. Ended in 2012 after the overthrow and execution of Gaddafi
- India by the UK due to nuclear exports restriction
- Macedonia total trade embargo by Greece (1994–1995)
- Mali total embargo by ECOWAS in 2012 to force the junta to return power to the civilian government and re-install the National constitution
- Nicaraguan embargo by the US
- North Vietnam (and then unified Vietnam) trade embargo by the US (1964–1994)
- Pakistan by the UK in 2002 on nuclear export restrictions
- Palestinian National Authority sanctions by Israel, US and other countries (2006–2007)
- Qatar by Saudi Arabia, United Arab Emirates, Bahrain, and Egypt due to Qatar's alleged support for terrorist organizations (2017–2021)
- South African sanctions by the international community during Apartheid (see also disinvestment from South Africa)
- Serbia by Kosovo's unilaterally declared government in 2011
- Yugoslavian sanctions by the UN in response to the Bosnian War (1992–2001)
- Embargo Act of 1807

== See also ==
- Arms embargo
- Boycott
- Economic freedom
- Economic warfare
- Globalization
- International political economy
- International sanctions
- Magnitsky legislation
- Political economy
- Shadow Fleet
- Specially Designated National
- Trade war
- Transshipment
