= India sanctions =

India has historically and largely not supported sanctions imposed by individual countries. The Government of India has largely supported United Nations sanctions. India has also been warned with sanctions, imposed with them, and has also imposed and threatened its own.

== Sanctions imposed by India ==
=== Countries ===
Country	Period	Summary
South Africa	1946–1993	India was the first country to sanction South Africa for the apartheid.
Fiji	1989–1999	Following deterioration of diplomatic ties India imposed a trade embargo.

== Sanctions against India ==
Sanctioning Country/Entity (s)		Period	Summary
Canada		1974	Following 1974 nuclear tests Canada sanctioned nuclear expertise and equipment support.
Multiple countries	United States	1998–1999	United States imposed sanctions as required by law following 1998 nuclear tests. Sanctions imposed by the United States were weakened through exceptions and lifted within a year.
Multiple countries	Japan	1998–2001	Sanctions including the stoppage of loan aid.
Multiple countries	~12 countries	–	Around 14 countries adopted some form of individual sanction or another following the 1998 nuclear tests with marginal effect. Collective sanctions could not gather the required support.
United States		1992–2011	Indian Space Research Organisation was sanctioned for sections of its space program related to cryogenic engines.
Pakistan		2019	Sanctions such as closure of airspace for all Indians following 2019 Balakot airstrike.
