= Locked Shields =

Cyber-defence exercise

Locked Shields is an annual cyber defence exercise organised by NATO's Cooperative Cyber Defence Centre of Excellence in Tallinn since 2010. The format is usually that a red team simulates a hostile attack while blue teams from the participating nations simulate their coordination and defence against this.

The performance of teams is assessed using a mix of automated and manual scoring. In 2022, there were 24 teams with an average of 50 experts in each team. The team from Finland was declared as the 2022 winner for the excellence of their situation reporting and solid defence.
