= DoublePulsar =

Backdoor implant tool

Malware details
- Technical name: Double Variant; Trojan:Win32/DoublePulsar (Microsoft); Backdoor.DoublePulsar (Fortiguard); Dark Variant; Trojan.Darkpulsar (Symantec); Win32/Equation.DarkPulsar (ESET)
- Family: Pulsar (backdoor family)
- Author: Equation Group

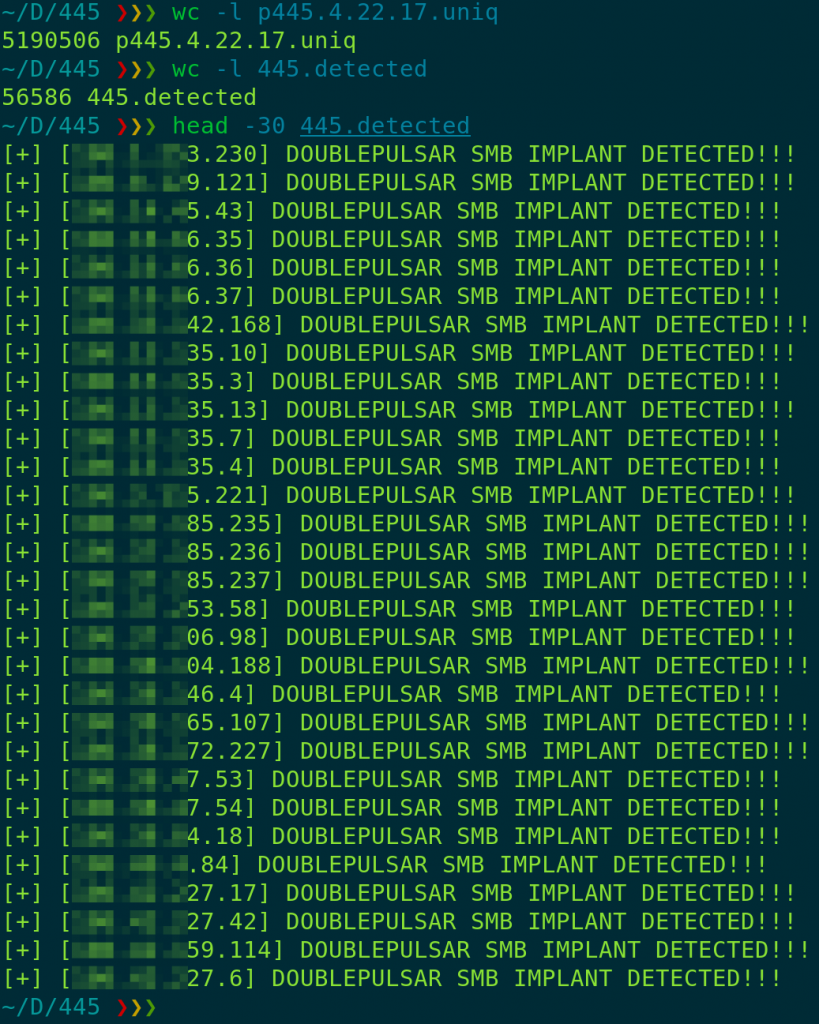

DoublePulsar is a backdoor implant tool developed by the U.S. National Security Agency's (NSA) Equation Group that was leaked by The Shadow Brokers in early 2017. The tool infected more than 200,000 Microsoft Windows computers in only a few weeks, and was used alongside EternalBlue in the May 2017 WannaCry ransomware attack. A variant of DoublePulsar was first seen in the wild in March 2016, as discovered by Symantec.

Sean Dillon, senior analyst of security company RiskSense Inc., first dissected and inspected DoublePulsar. He said that the NSA exploits are "10 times worse" than the Heartbleed security bug, and use DoublePulsar as the primary payload. DoublePulsar runs in kernel mode, which grants cybercriminals a high level of control over the computer system. Once installed, it uses three commands: ping, kill, and exec, the latter of which can be used to load malware onto the system.
