= FoxBlade =

2022 Windows malware

Malware details
- Technical name: Win32/FoxBlade
- Subtype: Wiper
- Origin: Russia (suspected)
- Authors: Unknown

Technical details
- Platform: Microsoft Windows

FoxBlade is a trojan horse wiper malware identified on 23 February 2022 by Microsoft's Threat Assessment Center that appeared to be aimed at targets in Ukraine's government. FoxBlade was discovered in Ukrainian networks on the day of the Russian invasion of Ukraine, and it is suspected it is part of the cyberattacks on Ukraine connected with that invasion. Coordination between the United States and Microsoft was reported as unusually productive, as executives were given security clearances to join calls with intelligence officials. Microsoft coordinated with the European Union to prevent FoxBlade from being used against other countries in Europe.

== See also ==
- Cyberwarfare
- Russian invasion of Ukraine
- NotPetya
