= Constantine the Philosopher University in Nitra =

Public university in Nitra, Slovakia

Coordinates: 48.3085°N 18.0910°E

- Latin: Universitas Constantiana Philosophii
- Type: Public
- Established: 1959
- Affiliations: European University Association
- Rector: Prof. Libor Vozár, CSc.
- Students: 7,898
- Location: Nitra,Slovakia
- Campus: Urban
- Colors: White and Turquoise
- Website: www.ukf.sk

University rankings

Regional – Overall
- QS Emerging Europe and Central Asia: 186 (2022)

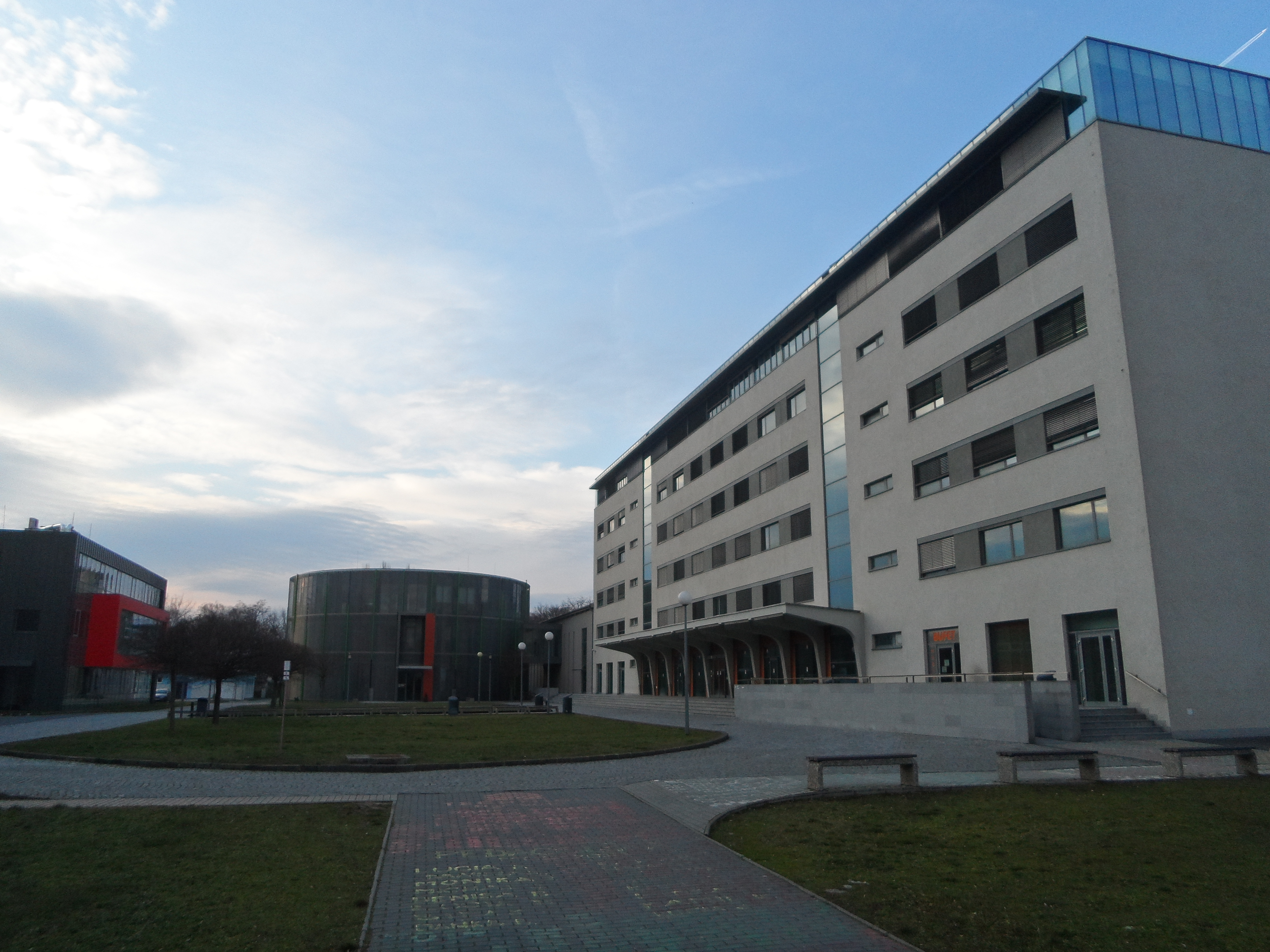
UKF Campus Zobor

Constantine the Philosopher University in Nitra (Slovak: Univerzita Konštantína Filozofa v Nitre) is a co-educational public university in Nitra, located in southwestern Slovakia. It is a modern educational, scientific and artistic research institution that since 1996 bears the name of one of the most important personalities in Slovak history – Byzantine missionary Saint Cyril (born Constantine, 827–869), the "Apostle to the Slavs".

UKF has five faculties and 7029 students, of which 5562 are enrolled in full-time study. The university is also attractive for foreign students. Currently (as of October 31, 2019), it is frequented by 345 students. The wide range of programs in the Bachelor's, Master's and Doctoral study is a key strength of the university. UKF is also focusing on student work and is known for numerous cultural, social, and sporting events and student activities, many of which with long traditions.

The university publishes the university magazine Náš čas and the student magazine Občas nečas.

== Notable alumni ==
- Zuzana Beňušková, ethnologist
- Ján Kuciak, investigative journalist
- Bruno D'Amore, mathematician

== See also ==
- Faculty Hospital, Nitra
