= Bruno D'Amore =

Italian mathematician

Bruno D'Amore (Born in Bologna, 28 September 1946) is an Italian mathematician and author.

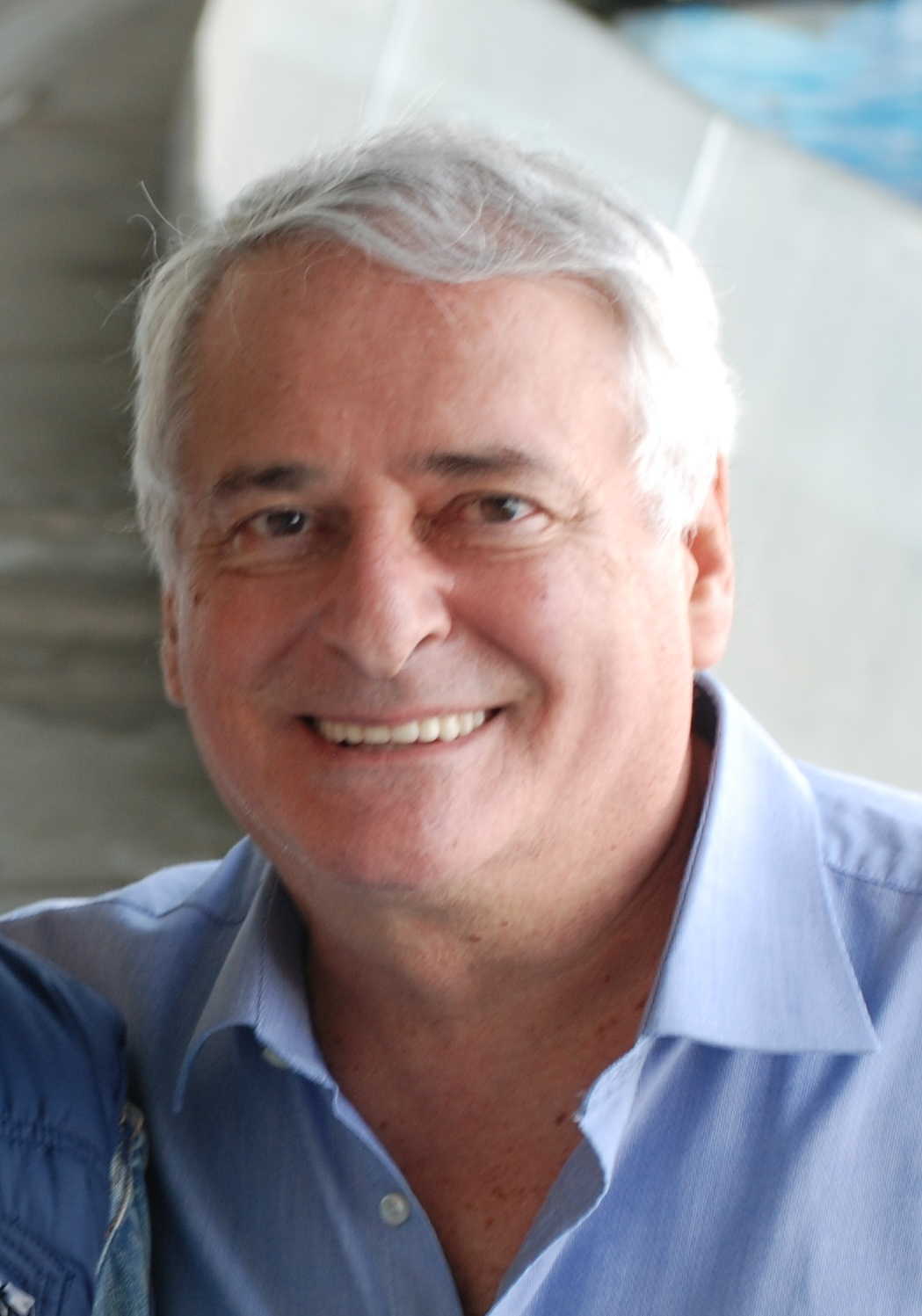
Bruno D'Amore

== Education ==
He has degrees in mathematics, pedagogy, philosophy, and a postgraduate qualification in Elementary Mathematics from a higher point of view, all obtained at the University of Bologna (Italy). D'Amore also has a Ph.D. in mathematics education from the University "Constantine the Philosopher" of Nitra in Slovakia.

== Career ==
Formerly professor in mathematics education at the University of Bologna, D'Amore currently holds seminars and supervises doctoral theses at the Universidad Distrital "Francisco José de Caldas" of Bogotá in Colombia. He also teaches postgraduate courses at other Colombian universities. He is a member of many research groups in Italy (NRD of Bologna), Spain (GRADEM, Barcelona) and Colombia (MESCUD, Bogotá) as well as the editorial boards of numerous scientific research journals in many countries. He is also a member of the Scientific Committee of International Research Groups and International Conferences. He is the author of two collections of stories, one of which won the "Arturo Loria 2003" literary prize from the municipality of Carpi, while the other won the "Il Ceppo 2003" literary prize from the municipality of Pistoia. He has also authored numerous publications. Since 1977 he has been a member of the Association International des Critiques d'Art. He has been the secretary of a Quadriennale d'arte in the Venetian Region, the director of a private art gallery in Bologna and a consultant at private and public art galleries in Italy. In 1986 he founded the National Conference "Incontri con la Matematica" (Meetings with Mathematics) whose first edition was held in Bologna. From the month of November of the following year the conference "Meetings with math" has always done, and is held annually, during the same period, in Castel San Pietro Terme - Bologna. The event, which has collected over the years more than 20000 teachers participating, is currently headed by Professor D'Amore and by Professors Silvia Sbaragli and Martha Isabel Fandiño Pinilla (his wife).

== Awards ==
D'Amore has been awarded various prizes for his studies and research, including "Lo Stilo d'Oro", 2000 edition; a nomination at "Pianeta Galileo 2010"; a Ph.D. ad honorem in Social Sciences and Education from the University of Cyprus, at Nicosia, on 15 October 2013, for the international relevance of his research in mathematics education (ceremony in Cyprus, ceremony in Bogota); the "Premio a la Contribución Científica Internacional en Ciencia y Tecnología" from the University of Medellín, on 10 May 2013. He has also been awarded honorary citizenship of Castel San Pietro Terme (Bologna) on 27 September 1997, and honorary citizenship of Cerchio (L'Aquila) on 5 September 2005.
