= Zuzana Beňušková =

Slovak ethnologist (born 1960)

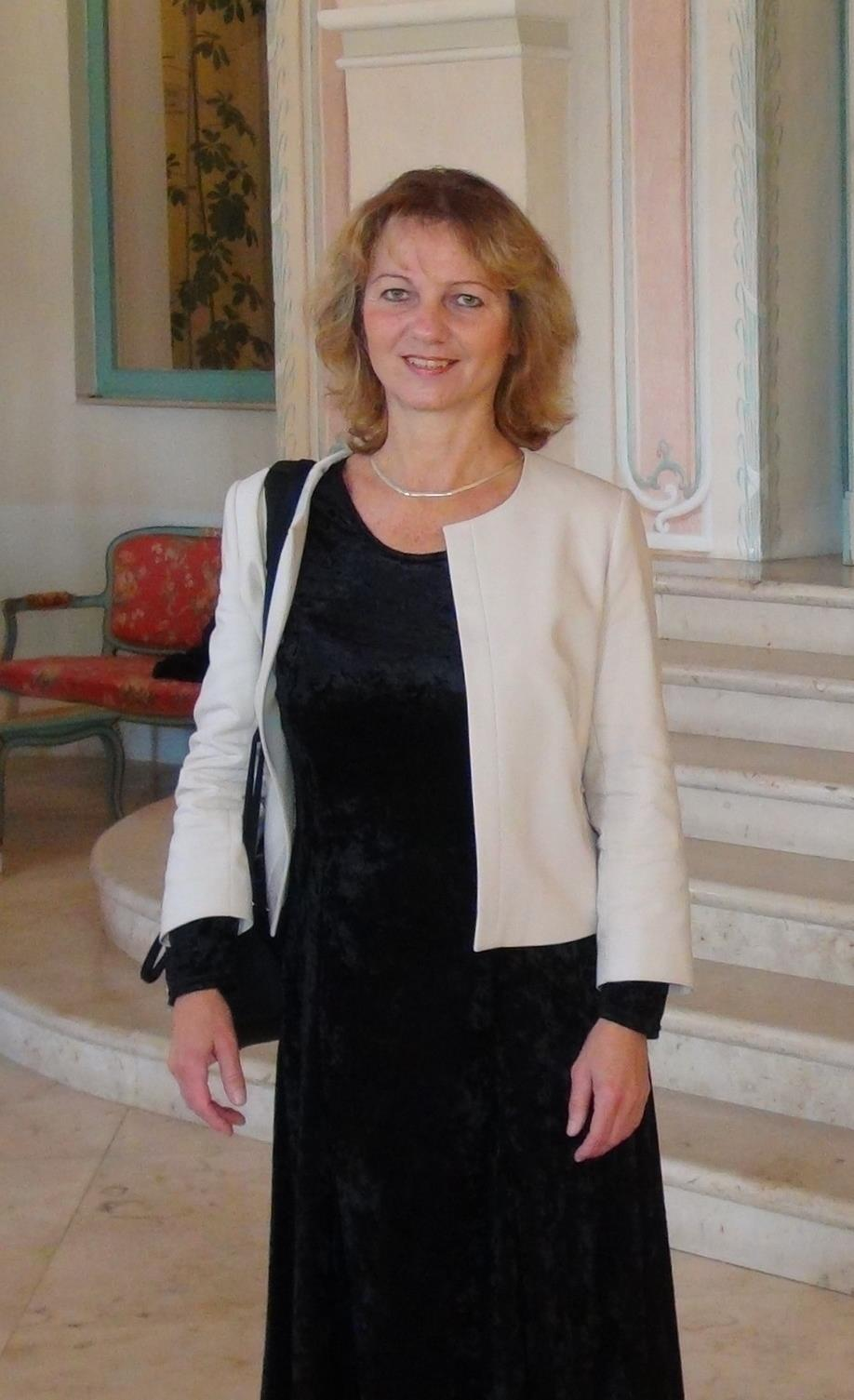
- Born: 27 October 1960 (age 65); Bratislava, Slovakia
- Education: Comenius University in Bratislava, University of Constantine the Philosopher in Nitra
- Children: Matej
- Scientific career
- Fields: Ethnologist, ethnographer, social anthropologist
- Website: www.zuzanabenuskova.sk

Prof. PhDr. Zuzana Beňušková, CSc. (née Zuzana Wagnerová, born 27 October 1960) is a Slovak ethnologist, ethnographer, cultural and social anthropologist. She is a professor of ethnology at University of Constantine the Philosopher in Nitra. Her fields of research are ethnic minorities, social relations, customs, cultural regions of Slovakia and history of ethnology.

== Early life ==
Zuzana Beňušková was born in Bratislava, Slovakia. She is a child of a teacher and sociologist doc. PhDr. Vojtech Wagner, CSc. and PhDr. Irena Wagnerová, CSc., andragogist.

== Academic career ==
Zuzana Beňušková graduated from Comenius University in Bratislava. She started to work at the Slovak Academy of Sciences, Institute of Ethnology, devoting to rituals, religiosity, ethnic minorities and the town ethnology. Since 1996 she also teaches at the Faculty of Philosophy of the University of Constantine the Philosopher (UCP) in Nitra. In 2004 she became an assistant professor and in 2013 a university professor. She was the Head of the Department of Ethnology and Ethnomusicology at the UCP University from 2005 until 2011.

== Projects and publications ==
Zuzana Beňušková is an author of over 100 journals and publication projects.

Beňušková, Z.: Religiozita a medzikonfesionálne vzťahy v lokálnom spoločenstve. / Interreligious relations in a local communities – Bratislava : ÚEt SAV, 2004. – 198 s.

Beňušková, Z.: Tekovské Lužany : kultúrna a sociálna diverzita vidieckeho spoločenstva. / Tekovské Lužany: Cultural and social diversity of the rural community. – Nitra : UKF, 2011. – 145 s.

Beňušková, Z. a kol.: Liptovská Teplička od druhej polovice 20. storočia. Nitra : UKF, 2013. – 304 s.

Beňušková, Z.: Prečo sú Vianoce tradičné aj nové? In: Popelková, K. a kol.: Čo je to sviatok v 21. storočí na Slovensku? Bratislava, Ústav etnológie SAV 2014, s. 110–163.

Beňušková, Z.: Občianske obrady na Slovensku. Bratislava : VEDA, 2017. – 134 s.

Beňušková, Z. a kol.: Tradičná kultúra regiónov Slovenska. – Bratislava : VEDA, 1998 a 2005. – 241 s. (The Traditional Culture of the Regions in Slovakia") (DAJAMA 2010 under the title The Folk Culture)

Beňušková, Z. – Jágerová, M. – Nádaská, K.: Dejiny slovenskej etnológie v 20. storočí . 1. vyd. – Nitra : UKF, 2013. – 88 s. [Beňušková Zuzana (50%) – Jágerová Margita (30%) – Nádaská Katarína (20%)]

Beňušková, Z.: Už sa chystá svadba istá. Svadobné obyčaje slovom a obrazom. – Bratislava: VEDA, 2020. 127 s.

Beňušková, Z.: Civil ceremonies in socialist Czechoslovakia and post-socialist Slovakia. Institute of Ethnology and Social Anthropology of the Slovak Academy of Sciences. Bratislava, Marenčin PT, 2021, 148 p. (e-Pub)

== Other activities ==
She was from 1992 the editor of the journal Etnologické rozpravy (The Discussions on Ethnology) in 2002 –2003; she was the chairperson of the Slovak Society of Ethnology (Národopisná spoločnosť Slovenska) in 2002–2008. She is a member of the Organising Committee of Etnofilm Čadca film festival.

== Personal life ==
Zuzana Beňušková has a son Matej.
