= Wiper (malware) =

Malware designed to erase files on the host computer

In computer security, a wiper is a class of malware intended to erase (wipe, hence the name) the hard drive or other static memory of the computer it infects, maliciously deleting data and programs.

== Examples ==
A piece of malware referred to as "Wiper" was allegedly used in attacks against Iranian oil companies. In 2012, the International Telecommunication Union supplied Kaspersky Lab with hard drives allegedly damaged by Wiper for analysis. While a sample of the alleged malware could not be found, Kaspersky discovered traces of a separate piece of malware known as Flame.

The Shamoon malware contained a disk wiping mechanism; it was employed in 2012 and 2016 malware attacks targeting Saudi energy companies, and utilized a commercial direct drive access driver known as Rawdisk. The original variant overwrote files with portions of an image of a U.S. flag that is burning. The 2016 variant was nearly identical, except using an image of the body of Alan Kurdi instead.

A wiping component was used as part of the malware employed by the Lazarus Group—a cybercrime group with alleged ties to North Korea, during the 2013 South Korea cyberattack, and the 2014 Sony Pictures hack. The Sony hack also utilized RawDisk.

In 2017, computers in several countries—most prominently Ukraine, were infected by NotPetya, which is a variant of the Petya ransomware that was a wiper in functional sense. The malware infects the master boot record with a payload that encrypts the internal file table of the NTFS file system. Although it still demanded a ransom, it was found that the code had been significantly modified so that the payload could not actually revert its changes, even if the ransom were successfully paid.

Several variants of wiper malware were discovered during the 2022 Ukraine cyberattacks on computer systems associated with Ukraine. Named CaddyWiper, HermeticWiper, IsaacWiper, and FoxBlade by researchers, the programs showed little relation to each other, prompting speculation that they were created by different state-sponsored actors in Russia especially for this occasion.

Some forms of ransomware have also been known to include a wiping component with them. A notable example of this was the Jigsaw ransomware which had a feature that would delete files every hour, as well as 1,000 files every time the computer rebooted. After 72 hours, if the ransom wasn't paid, the entire disk would be wiped.

== Solution ==
Reactive redundancy is a possible solution for data destruction protection. Researchers are able to create systems capable of analyzing write buffers before they reach a storage medium, determine if the write is destructive, and preserve the data under destruction. Moreover regular backups (as long as stored on an external device) provide the ability to restore lost data.
