= Oleksandr Kardakov =

Ukrainian IT businessman, cybersecurity expert

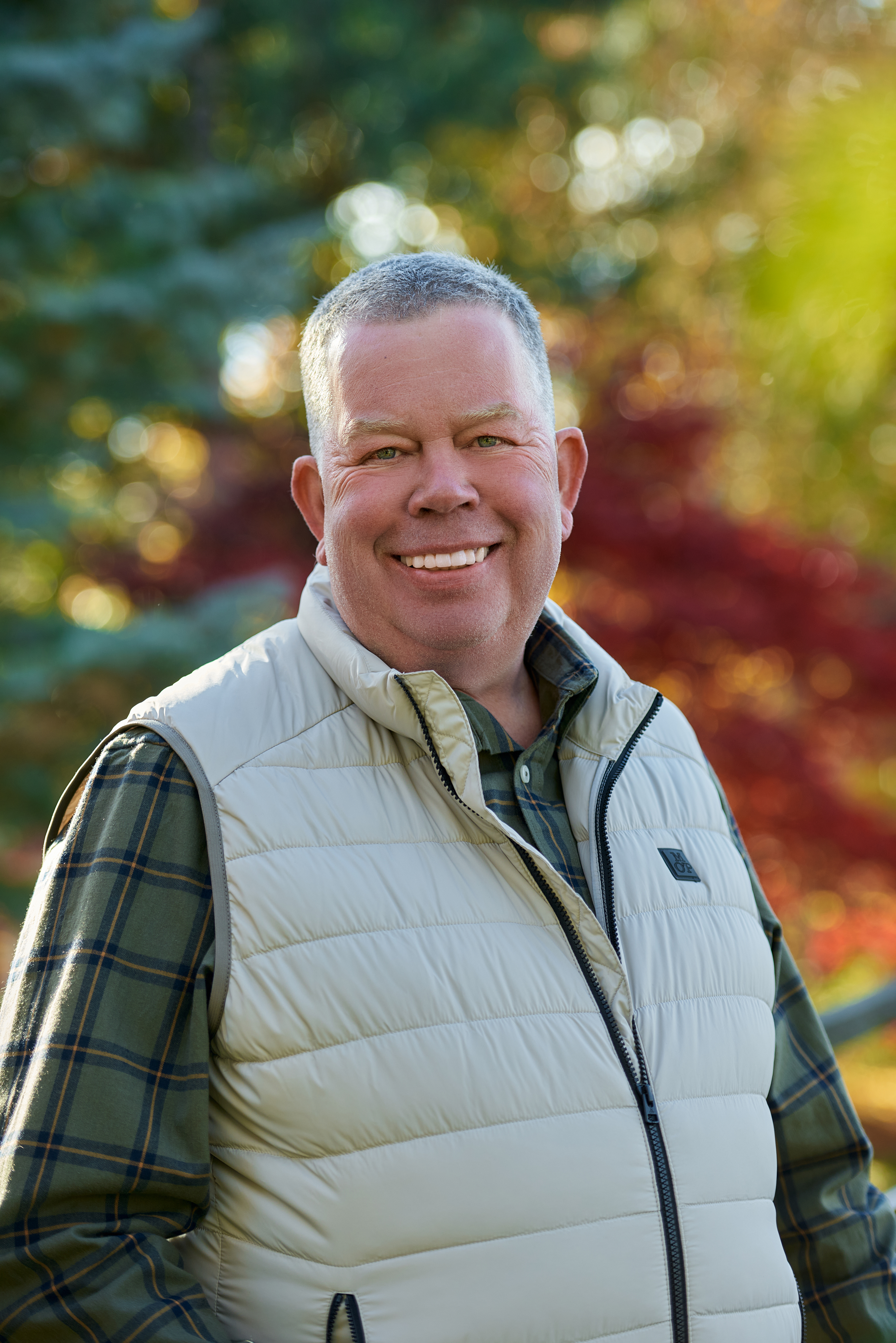
- Born: October 5, 1964 (age 61); Svitlovodsk, Kirovohrad region
- Occupations: entrepreneur, public figure

Oleksandr Kardakov (born October 5, 1964, Svitlovodsk, Kirovohrad region) is a Ukrainian cybersecurity and military-tech developer working for the Armed Forces of Ukraine technology advancement. He also helped Ukraine's government mitigate the effects of cyberattacks in November–December 2016 and the massive Petya virus attack in 2017 made by Russian hackers on Ukrainian infrastructure.

Since 2015, he has led the National Security Reform Council.

== Military-tech developments ==
Oleksandr Kordakov is the innovator behind the latest military-tech developments that form the foundation of the innovative products of the defense holding Octava Defence. In August 2023, Kordakov introduced SPHERE, the first platform for the protection of critical infrastructure objects.

In October 2023, Oleksandr Kordakov introduced the "Iron Dome," an advanced acoustic detection system designed to identify and counter Russian missiles and Shahed kamikaze drones, enhancing Ukraine's defense capabilities.

The system features the "ZIR" surveillance subsystem with high-resolution optical and thermal imaging.

In February 2024, Kardakov and his company "Avtor" introduced a new electronic identification for military personnel.

== Early life and education ==
Oleksandr Kardakov was born on October 5, 1964, in Svitlovodsk to a family of power engineers.

In 1987, Kardakov graduated from the Faculty of Electronic Engineering of the Kyiv Polytechnic Institute with a degree in electronic engineering.

== Career ==
In 1990, he co-founded and served as the technical director of Information Computer Systems (ICS), focusing on CAD implementation, software development, and automation hardware in the electronics industry.

In 2007, he founded Octava Capital, an asset management company.

He founded Octava Defence in 2018.

Oleksandr Kardakov is the founder and chairman of the CISO Association (Information Security Officers), a member of the Ukrainian chapter of ASIS (American Society for Industrial Security), and a member of the Association of Corporate Security Professionals of Ukraine (APKBU).

Kardakov worked on mitigating the effects of cyberattacks in November and December 2016 and the massive Petya virus attack in 2017.
