= Atlanta government ransomware attack =

Ransomware attack on the Atlanta government

- Date: March 22, 2018
- Location: Atlanta, Georgia, United States
- Type: Cyberattack
- Theme: Ransomware encrypting files with $51,000 demand (via Bitcoin)
- Cause: SamSam Ransomware
- Outcome: Multiple municipal services down, including databases and wi-fi Years' worth of data destroyed City spends $2.7 million in recovering services

The city of Atlanta, Georgia was the subject of a ransomware attack which began in March 2018. The city recognized the attack on Thursday, March 22, 2018, and publicly acknowledged it was a ransomware attack.

Due to Atlanta's national importance as a transportation and economic hub, the attack received wide attention and was notable for both the extent and duration of the service outages caused. Many city services and programs were affected by the attack, including utility, parking, and court services. City officials were forced to complete paper forms by hand.

On November 26, 2018, a grand jury indicted two Iranian security hackers, Faramarz Shahi Savandi and Mohammad Mehdi Shah Mansouri, for the attack. The Department of Justice alleged that Savandi and Mansouri are part of the SamSam group; that the SamSam group is based out of Iran; and that the pair created SamSam Ransomware, the malware used in the attack. There are no affiliations with the government of Iran.

== Approach and attack ==
Leading up to the attack, the Atlanta government was criticized for a lack of spending on upgrading its IT infrastructure, leaving multiple vulnerabilities open to attack. In fact, a January 2018 audit found 1,500 to 2,000 vulnerabilities in the city's systems, and suggested that the number of vulnerabilities had grown so large that workers grew complacent. The virus used to attack the city was the SamSam Ransomware, which differs from other ransomware in that it does not rely on phishing, but rather utilizes a brute-force attack to guess weak passwords until a match is found. It is known to target weaker IT infrastructures and servers. The ransomware has prominently been behind attacks on medical and government organizations since its discovery in 2016, with previous attacks on targets ranging from small towns such as Farmington, New Mexico to the Colorado Department of Transportation and the Erie County Medical Center. It can also bypass antivirus software. Despite no suspects being identified or indicted until November 2018, the SamSam hackers were described as "opportunistic".

On March 22, 2018, at 5:40 AM, the Department of Atlanta Information Management first learned of outages on various internal and customer applications “including some applications customers use to pay bills or access court related information,” according to Richard Cox, the city's interim Chief of Operations. Soon afterward, the city shut down many of its digital services in an attempt to control the situation, including its court system database and the wi-fi at Hartsfield–Jackson Atlanta International Airport. The city eventually identified it as a ransomware attack.

== Aftermath and recovery efforts ==
This hack was notable as it was the largest successful breach of security for a major American city by ransomware, potentially affecting up to 6 million people. Following the attack, the city of Atlanta cooperated with the FBI, Department of Homeland Security, and Secret Service and hired security firms such as SecureWorks to investigate, and many government computers were advised to stay powered off until 5 days later.

Though the city declared that there was little to no evidence that personal data had been compromised, later studies show that the breach was worse than originally estimated. By June 2018, it was estimated that a third of the software programs used by the city remained offline or partially disabled. In addition, many legal documents and police dashcam video files were permanently deleted, though the police department was able to restore access to all its investigation files. For a while, residents were forced to pay their bills and forms by paper.

In response to this hack, Atlanta devoted $2.7 million to contractors in order to recover, but later estimated it would need $9.5 million.

On November 26, 2018, the Department of Justice indicted two Iranian hackers for the attack, charging that Faramarz Shahi Savandi and Mohammad Mehdi Shah Mansouri were part of the SamSam group and created SamSam Ransomware.
