= Faculty Hospital, Nitra =

Hospital in Slovakia

Coordinates: 48.3007°N 18.0857°E

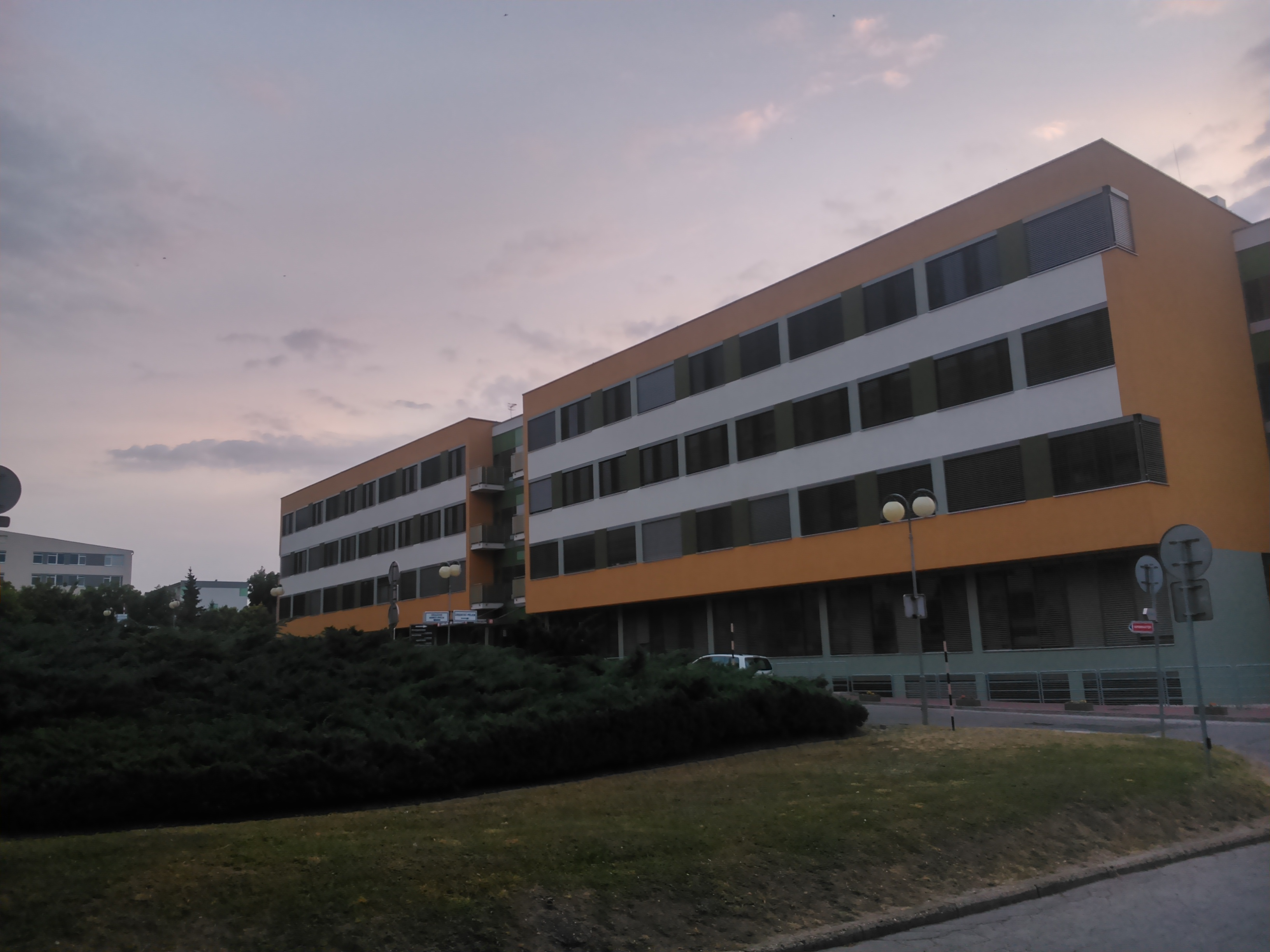
The new cardiology, neurology and internal clinic building at the Faculty hospital in Nitra

The Faculty Hospital in Nitra (Slovak: Fakultná nemocnica Nitra) is a hospital in the city of Nitra, in western Slovakia. Its address is Špitalská 6, 950 01, Nitra.

It is attached to the Constantine the Philosopher University in Nitra.
