= Lesley Carhart =

Cyber threat analyst

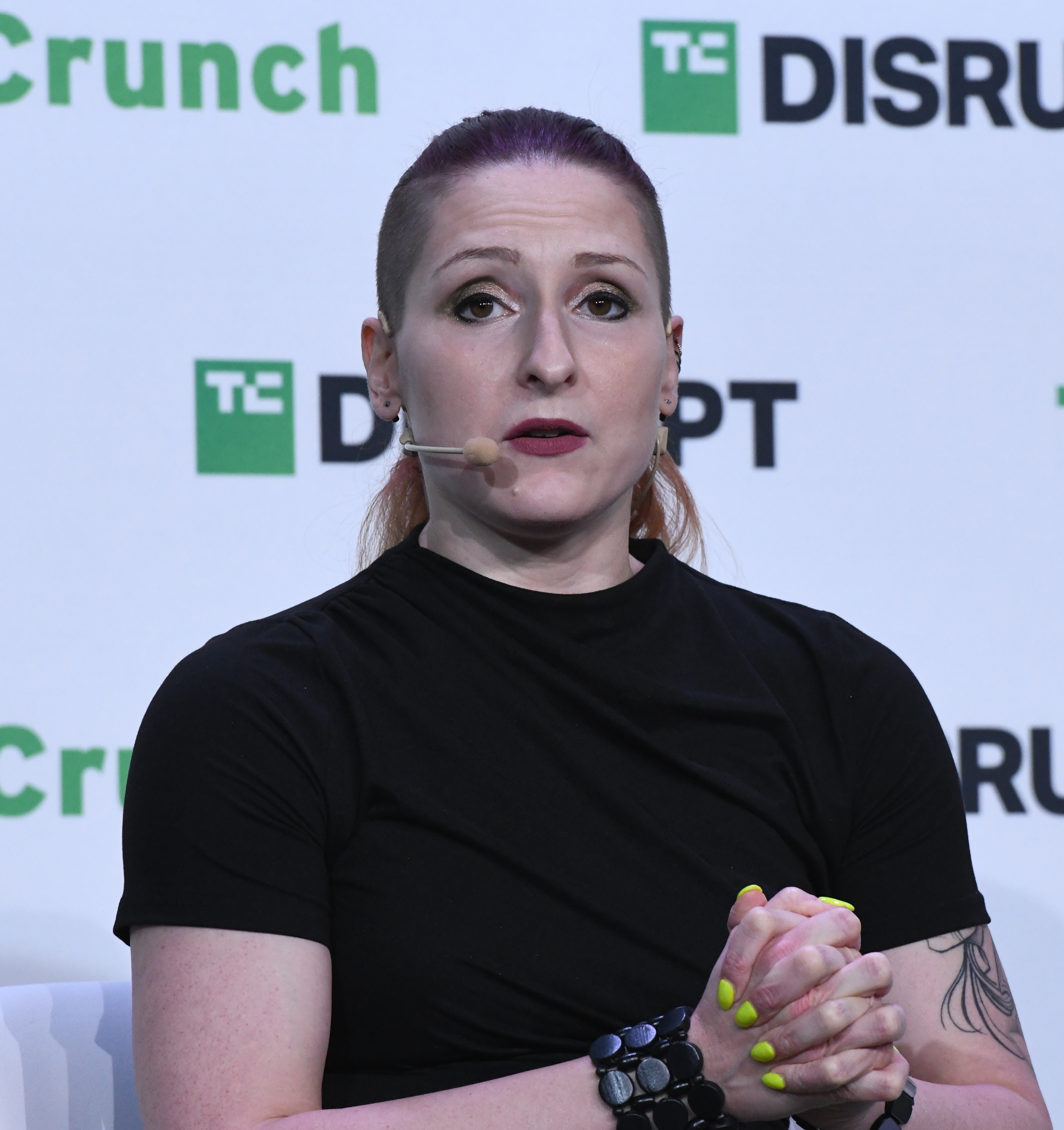
- Carhart in 2023
- Other name: hacks4pancakes
- Website: https://tisiphone.net/

Lesley Carhart a.k.a. hacks4pancakes is the Technical Director of Incident Response at industrial cyber security company Dragos.

They were described as one of the top 10 influencers in cybersecurity in 2019 through to 2020 by GlobalData research and were awarded the SANS Life Achievement Award in 2022.

They are involved with and comment on a broad range of cybersecurity topics including industrial control systems, the Solar Winds hack, ransomware attacks, smart device insecurity, remote working, multi-factor authentication, and the 2021 Microsoft Exchange Server data breach. Their published works include a white paper on defending operational technology systems against ransomware.

They are active in the information security community, offering career advice and involved in conferences, including organizing PancakesCon.

Lesley served 15 years in the Air Force Reserve, in the 934th Communications Squadron and the 434th Communications Squadron (A subdivision of the 434th Air Refueling Wing's Mission Support Group), attaining the rank of Master Sergeant.

Lesley is an open nonbinary, asexual and trans person with their pronouns being they/them.
