= Kaspersky Internet Security =

Internet security suite developed by Kaspersky Lab

- Kaspersky Internet Security for Windows
- Developer: Kaspersky Lab
- Initial release: 2006; 20 years ago
- Stable release: Windows 21 (21.20.8.505) (21 January 2025; 15 months ago) [±] OS X 21 (25.0.0.332e) (15 January 2025; 15 months ago) [±]
- Preview release: 2019 (19.0.0.648) [±]
- Operating system: Windows, macOS
- Type: Antivirus, personal firewall, parental control, email filtering, anti-phishing
- License: Software as a service
- Website: www.kaspersky.com/internet-security

Kaspersky Internet Security (KIS) is an internet security suite developed by Kaspersky Lab compatible with Microsoft Windows and Mac OS X. Kaspersky Internet Security offers protection from malware, as well as email spam, phishing and hacking attempts, and data leaks. Since 2023, Kaspersky has moved to a subscription model, and in the new lineup, Kaspersky Internet Security was replaced by Kaspersky Plus. KIS regularly participate in and achieve high results in independent tests by AV-Test, AV-Comparatives, and SE Labs. These organizations are members of the Anti-Malware Testing Standards Organization (AMTSO), which Microsoft has adopted as an “industry standard organization” for independent certification purposes. In April 2025, during AV-TEST testing, this software demonstrated 100% detection accuracy across malware samples and received a score of 6.0.

== Windows edition ==
=== Version 2007 (6.0) ===
Version 6.0 was the first release of KIS. PC World magazine noted the pros: 100% detection of common threats, 99.57% detection of adware, and 83.3 hidden malware in compressed files. Minuses - version 6.0 didn't completely remove malware, leaving registry entries and files behind, and false positives from the package (8 out of 20,000 clean files were incorrectly labeled as malware). In testing, the firewall blocked all attacks from inside and outside the computer. The graphical user interface was considered awkward to navigate, parental controls and instant messaging protection, which were in competing packages, were not included in the 6.0 version, and the retail price of $79.95 was considered relatively high by CNET and PC World.

KIS 6.0 supports Windows 98 SE, Me, NT Workstation 4.0, 2000 Professional, XP Home Edition, XP Professional, XP Professional x64, and Vista.

=== Version 2008 (7.0) ===
In version 7.0, the graphical interface was redesigned: components were renamed, reorganized, and PC World described the new interface as "intuitive" and "great-looking".

Parental control was introduced with settings for different age categories, manual configuration of profiles and their restrictions. There is an option to restrict Internet access by time, manual blocking of chat rooms and sites is available.

The spam filter was self-learning based on the user's actions to sort emails. But version 7.0 misidentified 30 percent of acceptable messages in PC Magazine's testing, and 30 percent of spam ended up in the inbox.

Data leakage protection was included in the package.

Malware protection performed mostly positively in AV-Test tests, detecting 100 percent of wildlist threats. But when using signatures from a month ago and a set of new malware, detection dropped to 14 percent. Version 7.0 successfully identified all six active rootkits, four of the six inactive rootkits, and was able to remove only two of the six rootkits.

This version required Windows XP Service Pack 2, except XP Professional x64 edition, or Vista.

=== Version 2009 (8.0) ===
Updated user interface, application filtering module, updated antivirus engine and vulnerability scanner. Added color indication of program status, reduced the number of pop-up notifications to a minimum.

Kaspersky claims the core anti-virus engine was revised to increase scan speed. PC Magazine found an initial scan took over two hours, however subsequent scans took two minutes to complete. However, malware detection was relatively low in comparison to other anti-virus applications tested. Out of 650 thousand samples, version 8.0 detected 95.6 percent. The top score was around 99 percent. Using two-week-old signatures, version 8.0 detected 52 percent of viruses in a different set of samples. Kaspersky also blocked about 60 percent of malware based solely on behaviour. The top performers scored 55.3 percent and 80 percent respectively. Version 2009 detected 98.1 percent of adware. However, PC World noted to achieve that kind of performance, users will have to modify program settings. On default settings, KIS allowed Zango to install. To block the installation, users must enable KIS to scan for "other malware".

The Security Analyzer looks for operating system and program patches. It also looks for vulnerable system settings, presenting users with a list of recommended actions to prevent malware from gaining access to a system. However, PC World criticized the amount of computer jargon used and lack of information about how adjust settings appropriately. On the other hand, PC Magazine found the feature straightforward, and often the solution involved downloading and installing an update.

KIS uses a whitelist by Carbon Black to classify trusted and malicious programs. Malicious programs are not allowed to run at all. Unknown programs falling in between the two categories are restricted in the actions they can perform. Its firewall blocked all attacks in PC Magazine testing. Phishing protection was introduced in this release. Testing by PC Magazine found the feature blocked 44 percent of phishing URLs. Internet Explorer 7 blocked 67 percent of the URLs, and Mozilla Firefox blocked 81 percent.

=== Version 2010 (9.0) ===
There was an updated user interface and a sandbox for running applications in a virtualized environment Version 9.0.0.736 fully supported the Windows 7.

=== Version 2011 (11.0) ===
The beta version with the new interface was released for all windows users on June 8, 2010. There was also a gadget for Windows Vista and Windows 7 users. PC Mag rated this version as "very good" (4/5 stars). The firewall was noted as very good, but that only made up for the lack of malware detection. Two critical fixes were included in version 11.0.2.556.

=== Version 2012 (12.0) ===
On 1 March 2011, Kaspersky released the first build of version 2012, it came out as beta version and in English, French and Russian version, with more versions due out later. On 7 June 2011 Kaspersky Lab announced the commercial release of Kaspersky Internet Security 2012 in France, Germany, Switzerland. The current version is 12.0.0.374.

=== Version 2013 (13.0) ===
The beta version was released to all Windows users on March 3, 2012, with a similar interface to Internet Security 2012. No Safe run, no Proactive defense, their functions being replaced by System Watcher (behavioral monitoring). Added a Safe Banking feature.

The Final Version was released on 28 August 2012 build 13.0.1.4190.

=== Version 2014 (14.0) ===
Beta testing started on 12 March 2013. The beta version was released to all Windows users on March 3, 2012, with a similar interface to Internet Security 2012. No Safe run, no Proactive defense, their functions being replaced by System Watcher (behavioral monitoring). Added a Safe Banking feature.

The Final Version was released on 28 August 2012 build 13.0.1.4190.

=== Version 2015 (15.0) ===
In April 2014, a beta version of the 2015 product, build 463, was released, followed by a technical release preview, of the near-complete 2015 product. The first official release of the product was in Bangladesh in June 2014.

=== Kaspersky Plus ===
In April 2023, Kaspersky Lab introduced a new subscription-based product lineup. Within this lineup, Kaspersky Plus replaced Kaspersky Internet Security. Kaspersky Plus retains the same core security modules as Internet Security, including antivirus, anti-phishing, firewall, and disk cleanup features. Kaspersky Plus also introduced new privacy- and identity-oriented features: password manager, VPN, data leak checker, home network device monitoring, hard drive health check, fake-shop detection, stalkerware detection, and enhanced system optimization tools. Starting in 2025, Kaspersky products for consumer users in certain countries will run on Linux distributions (Ubuntu, Unicom, Alt Linux, RED OS) in addition to Windows and Mac.

== Controversies regarding security ==
In March 2015, Bloomberg accused Kaspersky of having close ties to Russian military and intelligence officials. Kaspersky slammed the claims in his blog, calling the coverage "sensationalist" and guilty of "exploiting paranoia" to "increase readership".

As a result of alleged Russian involvement in the 2016 United States presidential election and ongoing investigations, the Department of Homeland Security officially banned the use of the Kaspersky Internet Security by the United States federal government in September 2017.

As of December 12, 2017, the use of Kaspersky software is banned from use by the American federal government by law.

On March 25, 2022, the FCC added Kaspersky software to its list of equipment and software that provide an unacceptable risk to the national security of the United States or the security and safety of United States persons.

On June 20, 2024, the Bureau of Industry and Security banned the sale of the software in the US, asking citizens who use it to switch to an alternative. The Bureau states that the company poses a national threat due to being based in Russia. The ban happened on July 20, 2024, with updates for existing customers allowed until September 29, 2024.

== See also ==
- Antivirus software
- Internet Security
- Eugene Kaspersky
- Natalya Kaspersky
- Kaspersky Anti-Virus
- Kaspersky Lab
