= Multiscanning =

Running multiple anti-malware engines concurrently

Multiscanning is running multiple anti-malware or antivirus engines concurrently. Traditionally, only a single engine can actively scan a system at a given time. Using multiple engines simultaneously can result in conflicts that lead to system freezes and application failures. However, a number of security applications and application suites have optimized multiple engines to work together.

== Reason ==
Testing agencies published results showing that no single antivirus engine is 100% effective against every malware threat. Because each engine uses different scanning methodologies and updates their malware definition files at various frequencies, using multiple engines increases the likelihood of catching malware before it can affect a system or network.

== Notable vendors ==
- F-Secure – Combines an in-house engine with Avira's engine.
- G Data AntiVirus – Combines in-house and BitDefender's engines. avast has been removed with version 2014.
- HitmanPro – Combines an in-house behavioral engine with a cloud containing engines from Kaspersky Lab, BitDefender and Sophos.
- Lavasoft Ad-Aware – Combines an in-house anti-spyware engine with Bitdefender's engine.
- Microsoft Forefront – Combines the engines of Authentium, Kaspersky, Norman and VirusBuster, with its own in-house engine.
- OPSWAT MetaDefender Cloud – Combines over 30 anti-malware engines to scan files for malware. Also available on-premise.
- Qihoo 360 Internet Security use Bitdefender Engine, QVM 2 Engine, 360 Cloud engine. But, the Chinese version includes the Avira engine additionally.
- TrustPort Antivirus – Combines the engines of BitDefender and AVG.
- VirusTotal

== See also ==
- Internet Security
