= Kaspersky Anti-Virus =

Antivirus solution

- Kaspersky Standard (version 21.17.7.539) on Windows 11
- Developer: Kaspersky Lab
- Release: 1997
- Stable release: 21.20.8.505 (21 January 2025; 22 months ago) [±]
- Operating system: Microsoft Windows, macOS, Linux, Android, iOS
- Type: Antivirus
- License: Proprietary
- Website: www.kaspersky.com/kaspersky_anti-virus

Kaspersky Anti-Virus (Russian: Антивирус Касперского (Antivirus Kasperskogo); formerly known as AntiViral Toolkit Pro; often referred to as KAV) is a proprietary antivirus program developed by Kaspersky Lab. It is designed to protect users from malware and is primarily designed for computers running Microsoft Windows and macOS, although a version for Linux is available for business consumers. Since 2023, Kaspersky has moved to a subscription model, and in the new lineup, Kaspersky Anti-Virus was replaced by Kaspersky Standard.

== Product ==
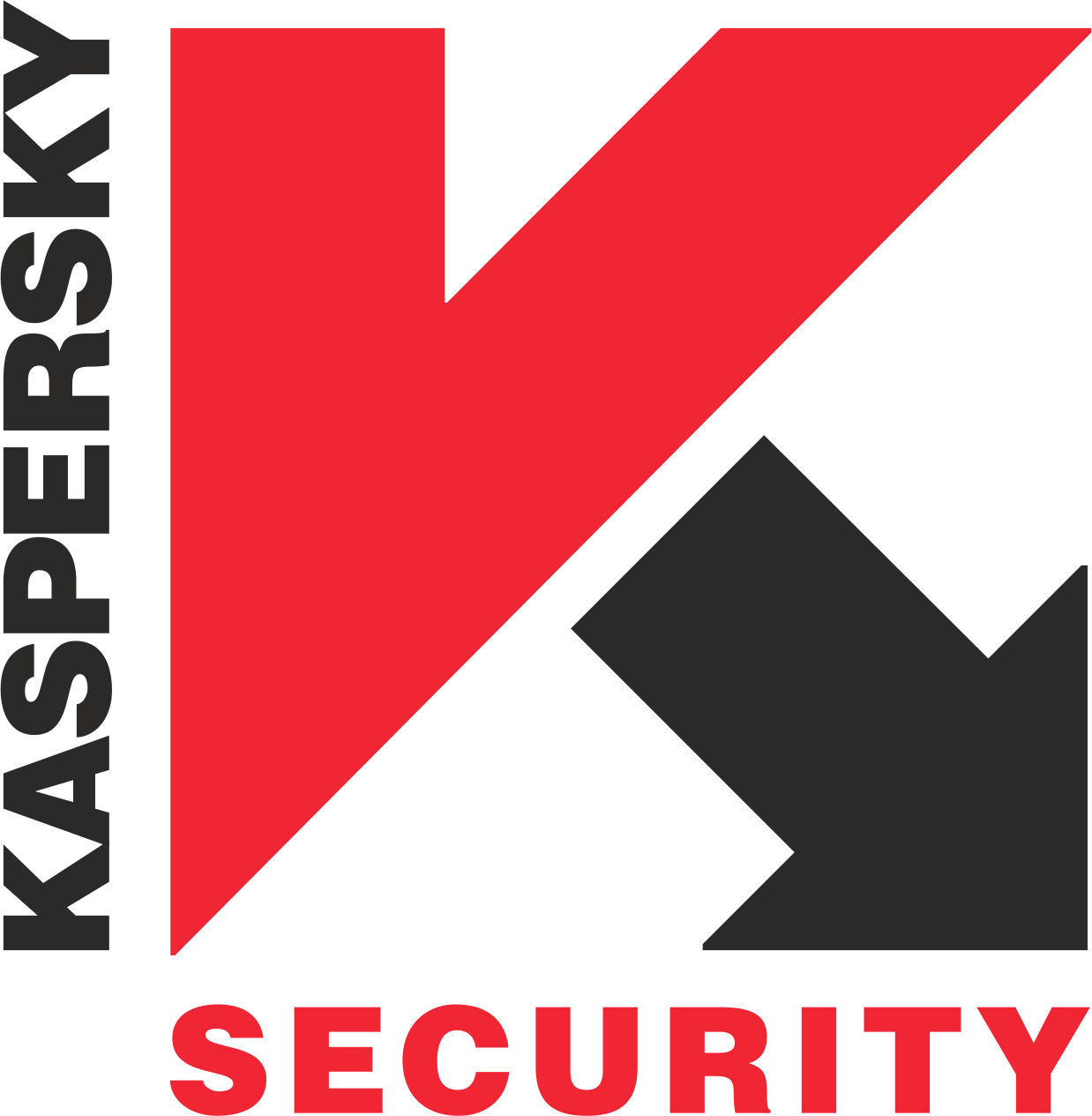
The old logo

Kaspersky Anti-Virus features include real-time protection, detection and removal of viruses, trojans, worms, spyware, adware, keyloggers, malicious tools and auto-dialers, as well as detection and removal of rootkits.

Microsoft Windows users may download an antivirus rescue disk that scans the host computer during booting inside an isolated Linux environment. Kaspersky Anti-Virus prevented itself from being shut down by malware without user authorization, functionality included scanning email and instant messenger traffic, and automatically disabling links to known malware hosting sites when using Internet Explorer or Firefox. In 2025, Kaspersky Standard provides protection against malware, ransomware, anti-phishing, real-time analysis of malicious sites, VPN connectivity and performance optimization.

=== Limits ===
Kaspersky, like the majority of its competitors, is incompatible with many other anti-virus and anti-spyware software, and is a type of program designed to run as the main anti-virus on the device.

== Security vulnerabilities ==
In 2005, two critical flaws were discovered in Kaspersky Anti-Virus. One could let attackers commandeer systems that use it, and one allowed CHM files to insert malicious code. Days later, the software maker had offered preliminary protection to customers, and a week later a permanent patch was made available.

== Operating systems ==
=== Microsoft Windows ===
Kaspersky has been initially developed for Windows, hence the system is supported with a client application since the very beginning.

=== Linux ===
An edition of Kaspersky's anti-virus solution for Linux workstations is available to business users since 2011. It offers many of the features included in the mainstream version for Windows, including on-access and on-demand scanners. Linux support in consumer products introduced in 2025 in some countries for Ubuntu, Unicom, Alt Linux and RED OS.

Specialized editions of Kaspersky Anti-Virus are also available for a variety of Linux servers and offer protection from most forms of malware.

=== Apple Mac OS X / macOS (since 2016) ===
The newly released Macintosh capable edition of Kaspersky Anti-Virus is compatible on (Intel Processor Based) Mac OS X Tiger and higher to include the brand new version Mac OS X Snow Leopard, released in August 2009. Kaspersky Lab internal testing concludes consuming only 2% CPU impact on performance and is designed to maintain a user friendly Mac-like interface with which Mac users are familiar. Kaspersky Anti-Virus for Mac contains definitions to detect and block malware affecting Windows, Linux and macOS alike. Kaspersky Anti-Virus for Mac also scans shared folders of users running Windows using Virtual PC on capable Apple Macintosh personal computers.

== System requirements ==
Minimum hardware requirements
Component	Windows XP	Windows Vista or later	Mac OS X v10.6 or later
Processor	Intel Pentium 4 or equivalent; 800 MHz	Intel Pentium 4 or equivalent; 1 GHz	—N/a
RAM	512 MB	1 GB	1 GB
Free hard drive space	480 MB	480 MB	350 MB

A DVD-ROM or CD-ROM drive, Internet Explorer 8 or above and Windows Installer 3.0 or above are also required for the installation of Kaspersky Anti-Virus in Windows. The latest version can either be downloaded from their official website or purchased through retail.

== Awards ==
Kaspersky products regularly participate in and typically achieve high results in independent tests by AV-Test, AV-Comparatives, and SE Labs. These organizations are members of the Anti-Malware Testing Standards Organization (AMTSO), which Microsoft has adopted as an "industry standard organization" for independent certification purposes.

In January 2024 Forbes Advisor compared Kaspersky with other tools such as BitDefender and Avast and rated Kaspersky in first place ("4.5" out of 5) of the platforms reviewed in their comparison exercise.

=== Historic Awards ===
In less recent history, PC World awarded Kaspersky Anti-Virus 6 the highest rank in its 2007 anti-virus comparative. In 2008, the well-known and highly regarded Ars Technica listed Kaspersky as "one of the best choices for Anti-Virus on the Windows platform."

Kaspersky Anti-Virus was "A-listed" by the UK PC journal PC Pro in late 2007, where it scored very highly for detection and removal of malware at the time with their Kaspersky Anti-Virus 7.0.

== Criticisms and controversies ==
In March 2015, Bloomberg accused Kaspersky of having close ties to Russian military and intelligence officials. Kaspersky criticized the article in his blog, calling the coverage "sensationalist" and guilty of "exploiting paranoia" to "increase readership".

In June 2015, United States National Security Agency and United Kingdom Government Communications Headquarters agents reverse engineered Kaspersky antivirus software for spying purposes.

On 15 March 2022, the German Bundesamt für Sicherheit in der Informationstechnik (BSI) issued a warning against the usage of Kaspersky antivirus and cloud software. For antivirus software to work it requires deep access into the user's system and thus a particularly high level of trust in the software, the vendor and the encrypted update channel. Due to certain actions of Russian military and intelligence forces and the threats issued by Russia against the European Union, the NATO and the Federal Republic of Germany as part of the Russian invasion of Ukraine, the usage of the software may not be considered trustworthy any longer and would impose a serious risk for a cyber-attack to be successful. Kaspersky responded that the warning is politically motivated, and that Kaspersky's data processing centers are located in Switzerland, the source code is available for inspection, and it is independently audited.

In 2024, the United States Congress voted to ban Kaspersky from operating in the United States due to Russian ties. They were ordered to cease operations and prevent sales of their software to American citizens.

=== U.S. Ban and Market Exit (2024) ===
In June 2024, the U.S. Department of Commerce's Bureau of Industry and Security (BIS) issued a Final Determination under its ICTS regulations, finding that Kaspersky posed an "undue or unacceptable risk to U.S. national security." This effectively prohibits Kaspersky and its affiliates from selling software, providing updates, or offering cybersecurity services in the U.S. to U.S. persons. The restrictions were phased: new sales banned as of July 20, 2024, and software updates halted by September 29, 2024.

As a consequence, Kaspersky began winding down U.S. operations, laying off employees, and withdrawing its products from U.S. platforms like the Google Play Store. Existing installs of Kaspersky for U.S. users were replaced with UltraAV, with many users claiming they were not giving the option to opt in or asked to approve the software install. Kaspersky and UltraAV claimed the customers were given multiple warnings and chances to opt out of the software change. Research organization Bitsight claimed in November 2024 that there was a roughly 64% drop in global organization usage of Kaspersky since the ban.

== See also ==
- Antivirus software
- Kaspersky Internet Security
- Eugene Kaspersky
- Natalya Kaspersky
