= Lavasoft =

Software company of Canada

Adaware
- Type: Private limited company
- Founded: Germany (1999)
- Headquarters: Montreal, Quebec, Canada
- Products: Adaware antivirus Lavasoft Digital Lock; Lavasoft File Shredder; Ad-Aware Web Companion; Lavasoft Privacy Toolbox
- Parent: Avanquest (Claranova)
- Website: www.adaware.com

Adaware, previously known as Lavasoft, is a software development company that produces spyware and malware detection software, including Adaware. It operates as a subsidiary of Avanquest, a division of Claranova.

Adaware's headquarters are in Montreal, Canada, having previously been located in Gothenburg, Sweden since 2002. Nicolas Stark and Ann-Christine Åkerlund established the company in Germany in 1999 with its flagship Adaware antivirus product. In 2011, Adaware was acquired by the Solaria Fund, a private equity fund front for entrepreneurs Daniel Assouline and Michael Dadoun, who have been accused of selling software that is available free, including Adaware antivirus prior to acquiring the company itself.

== Adaware antivirus ==
Adaware antivirus
- Developer: Adaware
- Release: 1999; 27 years ago
- Stable release: 12.4.930.11587 / June 27, 2018; 8 years ago
- Written in: C++, Visual Basic .NET
- Operating system: Microsoft Windows
- Available in: Multilingual
- Type: Antivirus software, Adware, Spyware
- License: Proprietary, Freeware
- Website: www.adaware.com

An anti-spyware and anti-virus software program, Adaware Antivirus, according to its developer, supposedly detects and removes malware, spyware and adware, computer viruses, dialers, Trojans, bots, rootkits, data miners,parasites, browser hijackers and tracking components.Adaware Antivirus has been discontinued. The developer states that Adaware Antivirus and its previous versions are no longer supported, and that definition updates are no longer provided. The developer's website also states that Adaware 14 is no longer available, while promoting Adaware Privacy as a separate product.

=== History ===
In the 2008 Edition, Lavasoft bundled Ad-Aware Pro and Plus for the first time with an antivirus scanner, which used the Avira engine and this arrangement continued for a few years. Starting with Ad-Aware version 10, the Bitdefender antivirus engine was used instead.

=== Reliability ===
According to PC World Magazine, an older version of Ad-Aware, the Anniversary Edition, could locate only 83.6% of malware in a comparative test carried out by the security firm AV-TEST. It ran no such tests on the newest version. Neil J. Rubenking of PCMag performed a lab test on version 8.3 and Ad-Aware scored 9.2 points, beating its previous best 9.1.

=== Market share ===
In July 2013, Adaware Antivirus Free was listed as having been downloaded a total of 450 million times from the Lavasoft site, including over 387 million times from Download.com as of December 2014. According to OPSWAT, in January 2015, Ad-Aware had less than 1% of market share globally. Paid versions of the product are being competed from low-cost or free products, such as Microsoft Security Essentials.

== Controversies ==
The company was acquired in January 2011, as Lavasoft, by the Solaria Fund, a private equity fund, front for Daniel Assouline and Michael Dadoun, key people of UpClick and Interactive Brands. SC Magazine reported that Lavasoft had been acquired by the same entrepreneurs who have been accused of selling software that is available free to unwitting users under the guise of premium support, including the free version of Lavasoft's security program prior to acquiring the company itself. Security consultant Dancho Danchev has documented this controversy.

Additionally, Danchev has reported in 2013 that Lavasoft was used to hide hard-to-uninstall programs into third-party software to trick the users in installing them, like in the K-Lite Codec Pack, and the Lavasoft Web Companion changed your browser without the user's permission. Although the company shields itself behind the complete legality of bundled software and claims that their software is only used to fight malware, there are users who have branded their products as malware.

In February 2015, it was reported by CERT Coordination Center, that a new security feature in Ad-Aware Web Companion was implemented with Komodia SSL Digestor, one of Komodia's public SDKs, the company behind the Superfish security incident in Lenovo machines.
