= Norman Safeground =

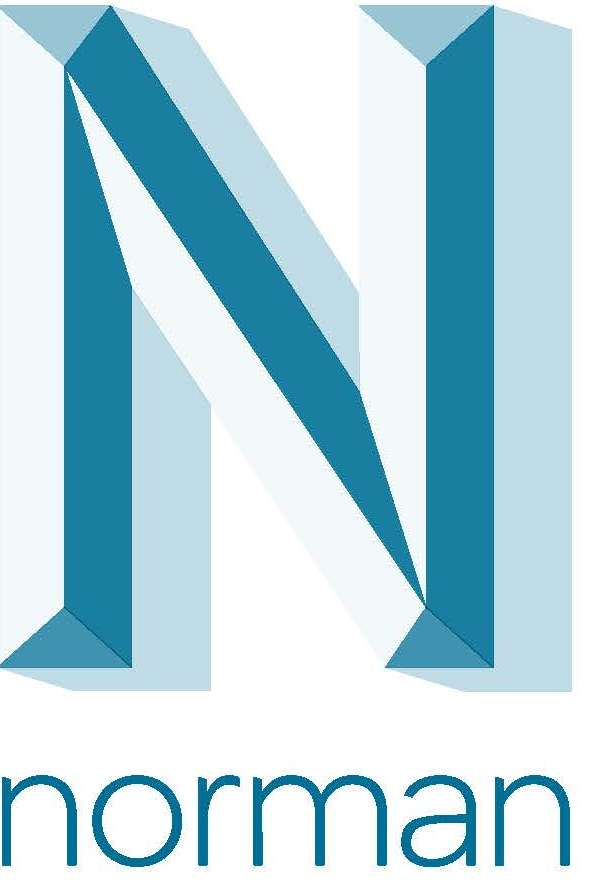
- Industry: Computer software, Security
- Predecessor: Norman ASA
- Founded: Oslo, Norway (1 October 1984)
- Headquarters: Oslo, Norway
- Area served: Worldwide
- Parent: AVG Technologies Norway AS
- Website: www.norman.com

Norman Safeground AS is a developer of data security software, such as anti-virus, anti-spam, anti-spyware and backup with local support. The company headquarters is in Oslo, Norway. Norman Safeground has a global partner-network, and the main market is Europe.

Norman competes in the antivirus industry against Avira, BullGuard, F-Secure, Frisk, Kaspersky, McAfee, Panda Security, Sophos, Symantec and Trend Micro among others.

== History ==
Norman was founded on 1 October 1984 in Oslo. The company was a pioneer in proactive security software and forensics malware tools, utilizing a patented sandbox technology.

In 1995, Norman acquired 50 percent of IBAS AS, a Norwegian data recovery company. The company was listed on Oslo Stock Exchange on 11 August 1997. Norman ASA bought the remaining 50 percent stake in IBAS in 1999.

In 1998, Norman acquired ThunderByte Antivirus.

In 2004, Norman and IBAS AS were de-merged and IBAS was listed as a separate entity on the Oslo Stock Exchange.

Norman was de-listed from Oslo Stock Exchange in October 2009 as it was acquired by the private equity fund FSN Capital Partners. In late 2012, Norman ASA was split into two companies, Norman Safeground AS focusing on consumers and SMEs and Norman Shark AS focusing on the enterprise market with their intrusion prevention services.

In November 2014, Norman Safeground was acquired by AVG Technologies, which two years later was acquired by Avast.
