= Mikko Hyppönen =

Finnish computer security expert

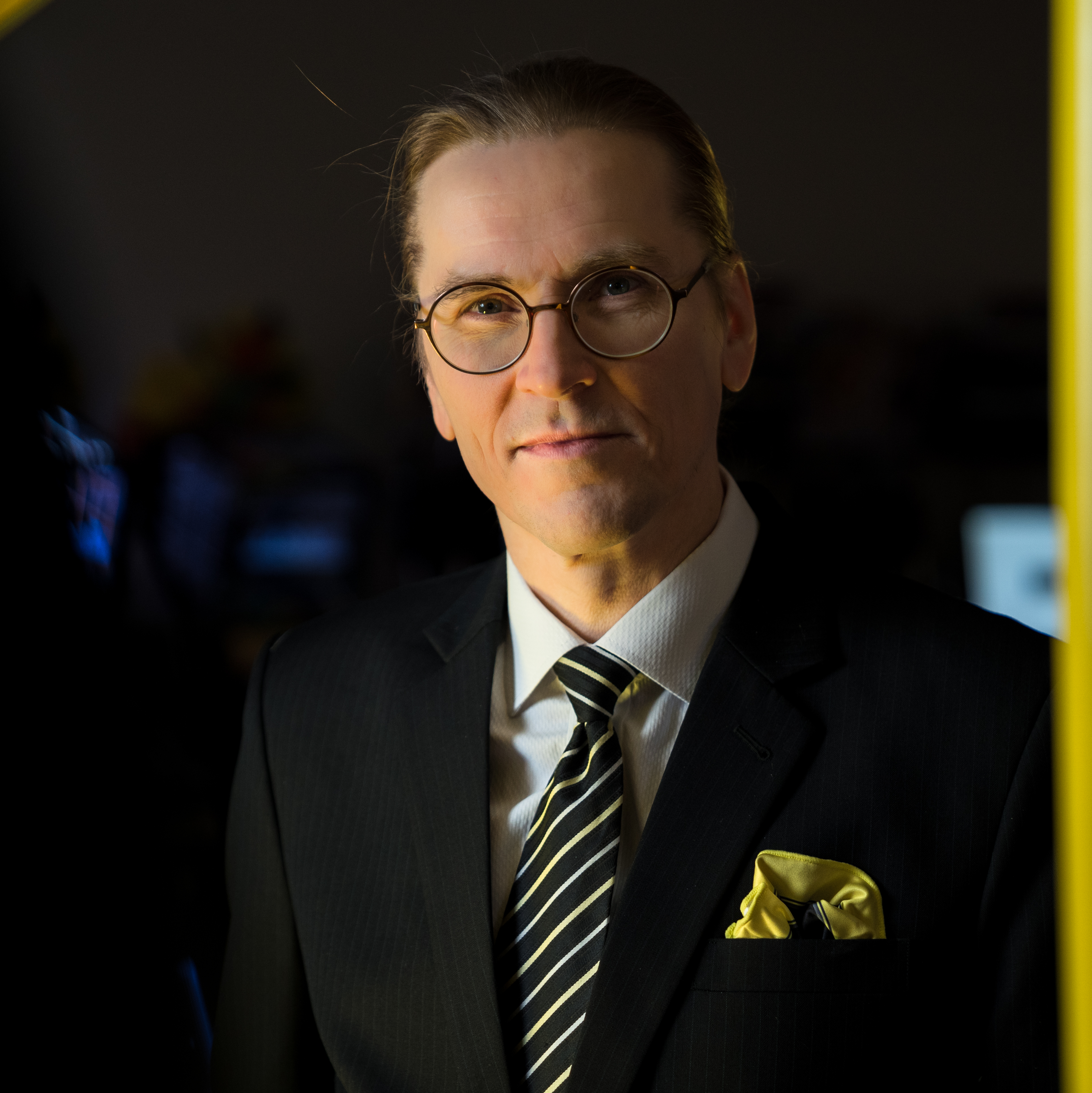
- Hyppönen in 2021
- Born: Mikko Hermanni Hyppönen; 13 October 1969 (age 57); Finland
- Other name: Mikko Hypponen
- Occupation: Chief Research Officer for Sensofusion
- Awards: CISO MAG Cybersecurity Person of the Year 2020 #61 Foreign Policy's Top 100 Global Thinkers in 2011 Virus Bulletin Award for Best educator in the anti-malware industry 2010 #43 on the 50 Most Important People on the Web 2007 list by PC World
- Mikko Hyppönen introducing himself recorded May 2016
- Website: mikko.com

Mikko Hyppönen (Finnish pronunciation: [ˈmikːo ˈhypːønen]; born 13 October 1969) is a Finnish computer security expert, speaker and author. He is known for the Hyppönen Law of IoT security, which states that whenever an appliance is described as being "smart", it is vulnerable. He worked for 34 years as the Chief Research Officer at WithSecure and as the Principal Research Advisor at F-Secure, before joining Sensofusion in 2025.

== Career ==
Mikko Hyppönen worked at F-Secure in Finland from 1991, and later at WithSecure following the company's business division spin-off in 2022. Hyppönen announced in June 2025 that he would depart WithSecure after a 34-year tenure to become Chief Research Officer and part-owner at Sensofusion, a Finnish company specializing in anti-drone technologies.

Hyppönen has assisted law enforcement in the United States, Europe and Asia since the 1990s on cybercrime cases and advises governments on cyber crime. His team took down the Sobig.F botnet.

In 2004, Hyppönen cooperated with Vanity Fair on a feature, The Code Warrior, which examined his role in defeating the Blaster and Sobig Computer worms.

Hyppönen has given keynotes and presentations at a number of conferences around the world, including Black Hat, DEF CON, DLD, RSA, and V2 Security. In addition to data security events, Hyppönen has delivered talks at general-interest events, such as TED, TEDx, DLD, SXSW, Slush and Google Zeitgeist. He's also spoken at various military events, including AFCEA events and the NATO CCD COE's ICCC. Hyppönen is a reserve officer in the Finnish Army.

Hyppönen is a member of the advisory board of IMPACT (International Multilateral Partnership Against Cyber Threats) since 2007 together with Yevgeny Kaspersky, Hamadoun Touré, Fred Piper and John Thompson.

Hyppönen is a columnist for BetaNews and Wired. He has also written on his research for CNN, The New York Times and Scientific American.

In 2011, he was ranked 61st in Foreign Policy's Top 100 Global Thinkers report.

== Computer security history ==
In 2011, Hyppönen tracked down and visited the authors of the first PC virus in history, Brain. He produced a documentary of the event. The documentary was published on YouTube.

Hyppönen has also been documenting the rise of mobile phone malware since the first smartphone viruses were found.

The blog "News from the Lab", started by Hyppönen in 2004 was the first blog from any antivirus company.

Hyppönen has been credited by Twitter for improving Twitter's security.

Hyppönen has been the Curator for the Malware Museum at The Internet Archive since 2016.

He published his first book in October 2021, and its English translation, If It's Smart, It's Vulnerable, was published in June 2022.

== See also ==
- Antivirus software
- CARO
- EICAR
- IMPACT
