= AGI-Plan =

DOS-platform based malware

Malware details
- Technical name: Month 2-4
- Alias: Month 2-4, Agiplan
- Type: DOS
- Subtype: COM file, destructive
- Classification: Virus
- Family: Zero Bug
- Origin: Unknown
- Author: Unknown

AGI-Plan was a memory resident DOS file infector first isolated at the Agiplan software company in Germany. Because of CARO standards that dictate that viruses should not be named after companies, AGI-Plan's technical name is Month 4–6. This name also violates CARO standards, but a more minor rule involving syntax. AGI-Plan is related to the Zero Bug virus, as both it and AGI-Plan prepend 1,536 bytes to files they infect.

AGI-Plan is not initially damaging until several months after the initial infection, hence its name. After activation, AGI-Plan will begin to corrupt write operations, which results in slow, difficult-to-notice damage over time.

AGI-Plan is notable for reappearing in South Africa in what appeared to be an intentional re-release several years after. AGI-Plan never succeeded in spreading significantly beyond the isolated incidents in Germany and South Africa.
