= McAfee Antivirus =

Antivirus software

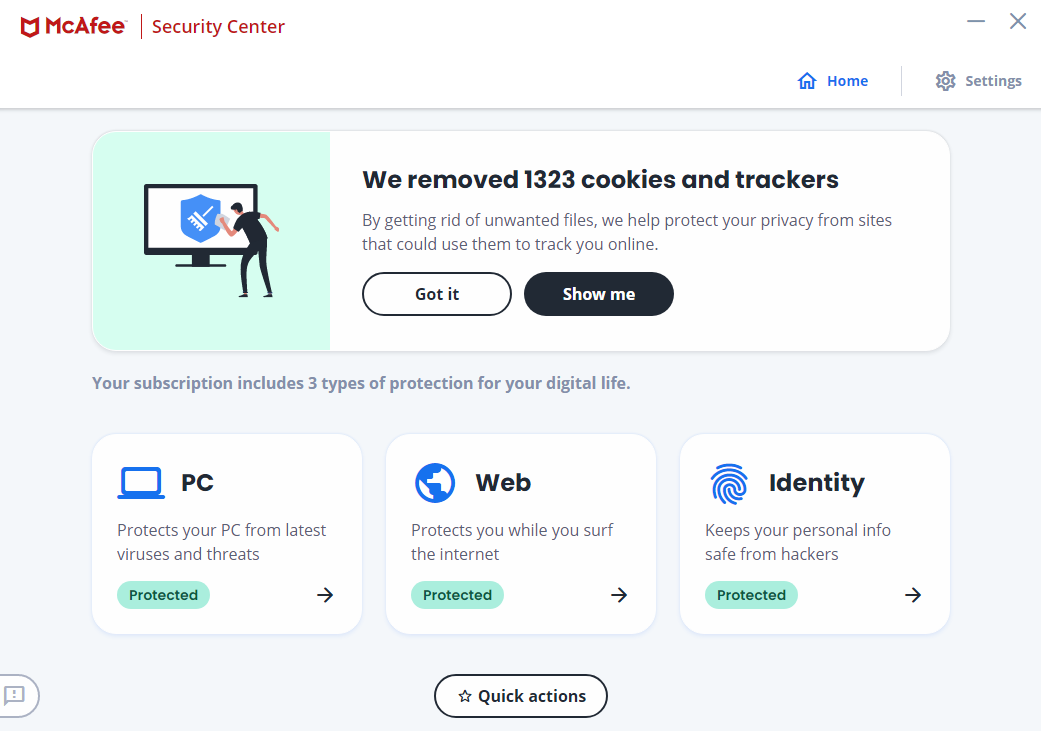
- McAfee SecurityCenter on Windows 10
- Developer: McAfee
- Release: 1988; 38 years ago

Stable release(s)
- SecurityCenter: 19.14.143 / March 9, 2022; 4 years ago
- VirusScan: 25.7.148 / March 12, 2022; 4 years ago
- Personal Firewall: 21.4.143 / December 4, 2021; 4 years ago
- WebAdvisor: 4.1.1.685 / March 12, 2022; 4 years ago
- QuickClean and Shredder: 20.4.162 / March 9, 2022; 4 years ago
- Vulnerability Scanner: 10.4.110 / March 9, 2022; 4 years ago
- App Boost: 18.24.154 / March 9, 2022; 4 years ago
- VPN: 18.24.156 / March 9, 2022; 4 years ago
- Operating system: Microsoft Windows, Mac OS X, Android, IOS
- Type: Antivirus
- License: Proprietary commercial software

McAfee Antivirus is an antivirus software created and maintained by McAfee (formerly known as Intel Security, and Network Associates prior to that). Originally marketed as a standalone product, it is also sold as part of bundles.

== VirusScan Enterprise ==
Before McAfee completed the sale of its enterprise business it also produced an enterprise-level product named VirusScan Enterprise which was designed this for use on larger networks to make management of antivirus software on multiple computers easier. Unlike the home-user edition, the Enterprise edition consisted of a client application for networked computers. Clients could be controlled using the included ePolicy Orchestrator (ePO), which was a unified console that could control VirusScan and other McAfee products. Support for VirusScan Enterprise ended on December 31, 2021.

== McAfee Antivirus for Mac ==
In November 2008 McAfee announced VirusScan for Mac OS. (Earlier versions used the name Virex, developed by HJC Software.) McAfee Antivirus for Mac is now only available as part of McAfee Antivirus Plus, McAfee Internet Security, McAfee Total Protection, McAfee McAfee+ Premium, McAfee+ Advanced, McAfee+ Ultimate, and McAfee Business Protection, and includes a firewall, VPN, Safe browsing and a password manager. It supports macOS 11.x and higher.

== Controversies ==
=== Independent test results ===
Until approximately 2016 McAfee suffered from poorer malware detection test results and a larger impact on PC performance.

Since end of 2016 with the introduction of AI and machine learning detection technologies initially called McAfee Real-Protect, the test results have changed significantly though. AV-TEST (Germany) awarded McAfee with a TOP Product certification in the last 29 tests, SE Labs (UK) gave McAfee an AAA rating in the last 26 tests and AV-Comparatives has been certifying McAfee win an ADVANCED+ rating in its Real-World Protection tests since July 2022. AV-Comparatives has also rated McAfee as ADVANCED+ in almost all Performance tests since October 2016.

In January 2025 AV-Comparatives published its 2024 Summary Report in which it awarded McAfee with two Gold awards: the 2024 Real-World Protection Gold Award and the Best Overall Speed Gold Award.

AV-Comparatives’ Real-World Protection Test measures a product's ability to combat malware under everyday conditions. Winners of this test, such as McAfee, provide high levels of protection with minimal false alarms, sparing users the stress and burden of identifying whether something is harmful.

The PC Performance Test evaluates the impact of a security product on system performance. McAfee showed the lowest impact on PC performance of all tested vendors throughout 2024.

=== 2010 reboot problem ===
On April 21, 2010, beginning approximately at 2 PM GMT, an erroneous virus definition file update from McAfee affected millions of computers worldwide running Windows XP Service Pack 3. The update resulted in the removal of a Windows system file (svchost.exe) on those machines, causing machines to lose network access and, in some cases, to enter a reboot loop. McAfee rectified this by removing and replacing the faulty DAT file, version 5958, with an emergency DAT file (version 5959) and posted a fix for the affected machines in its consumer "KnowledgeBase".

=== 2012 update issues ===
An August 2012 update to McAfee antivirus caused the protection to become turned off and users to lose internet connections. McAfee was criticized for not notifying users promptly of the issues when they learned about it.

== See also ==
- Internet security
