= ESET NOD32 =

Computer protection software

ESET NOD32 Antivirus
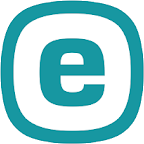

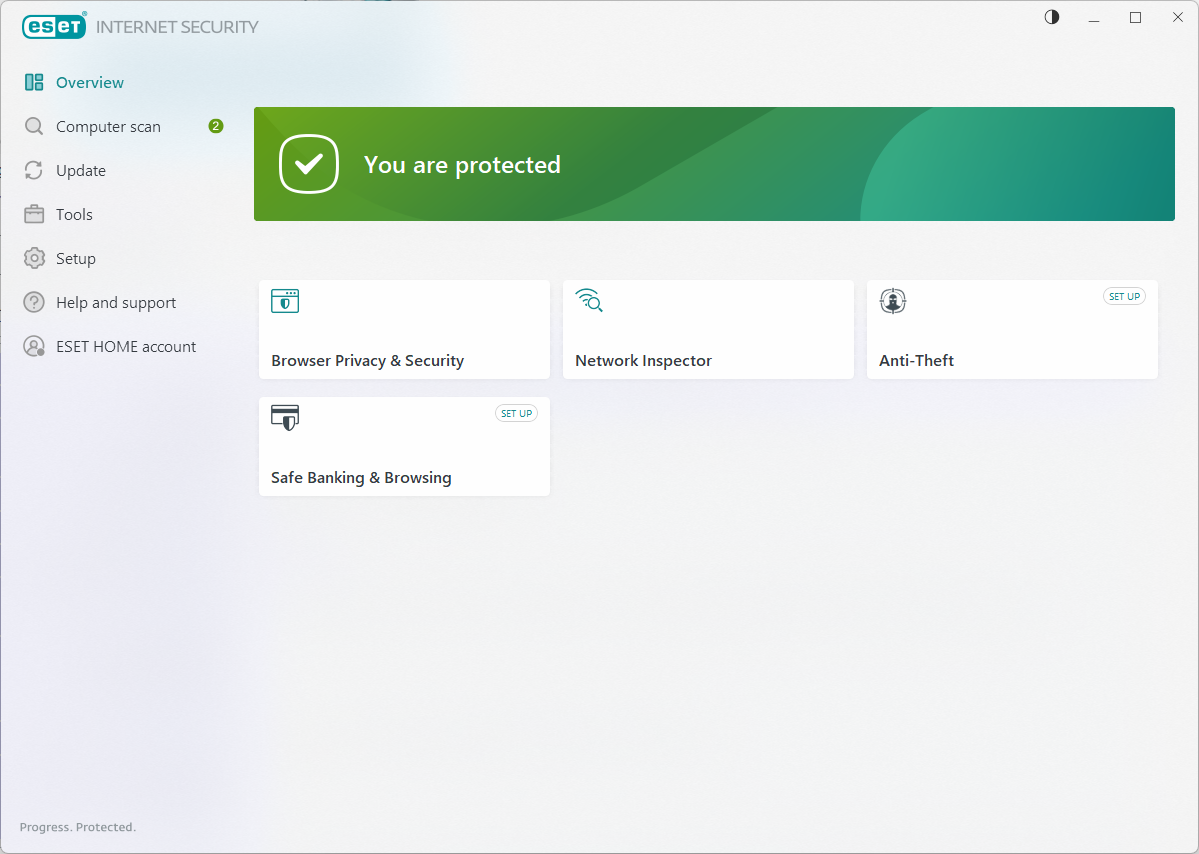
- ESET Internet Security 18 running on Windows 11
- Original author: ESET
- Developer: ESET
- Release: 1987
- Stable release: 19.0.14.0 / November 24, 2025; 10 months ago
- Written in: Assembly language, C/C++
- Operating system: Microsoft Windows, macOS, Linux, FreeBSD, Solaris, Windows Mobile, Android
- Size: 103 MB (32-bit), 108 MB (64-bit)
- Type: Antivirus software
- License: Shareware, Trialware
- Website: eset.com/home/antivirus

ESET NOD32, commonly known as NOD32, is an antivirus software package made by the Slovak company ESET. ESET NOD32 Antivirus is sold in two editions, Home Edition and Business Edition. The Business Edition packages add ESET Remote Administrator allowing for server deployment and management, mirroring of threat signature database updates and the ability to install on Microsoft Windows Server operating systems.

== History ==
=== NOD32 ===
The acronym NOD stands for Nemocnica na Okraji Disku ("Hospital at the end of the disk"), a pun related to the Czechoslovak medical drama series Nemocnice na kraji města (Hospital at the End of the City). The first version of NOD32 – called NOD-ICE – was a DOS-based program. It was created in 1987 by Miroslav Trnka and Peter Paško at the time when computer viruses started to become increasingly prevalent on PCs running DOS. Due to the limitations of the OS (lack of multitasking among others) it didn't feature any on-demand/on-access protection nor most of the other features of the current versions. Besides the virus scanning and cleaning functionality it only featured heuristic analysis. With the increasing popularity of the Windows environment, advent of 32-bit CPUs, a shift in the PC market and increasing popularity of the Internet came the need for a completely different antivirus approach as well. Thus the original program was re-written and christened "NOD32" to emphasize both the radical shift from the previous version and its Win32 system compatibility.

Initially the program gained popularity with IT workers in Eastern European countries, as ESET was based in Slovakia. Though the program's abbreviation was originally pronounced as individual letters, the worldwide use of the program led to the more common single-word pronunciation, sounding like the English word nod. Additionally, the "32" portion of the name was added with the release of a 32-bit version in the Windows 9x era. The company reached its 10000th update to virus definitions on June 25, 2014.

=== Mail Security for Microsoft Exchange Server ===
On March 10, 2010 ESET released ESET Mail Security for Microsoft Exchange Server, which contains both antimalware and antispam modules. It supports Microsoft Exchange 5.5, 2000, 2003, 2007 and 2010.

=== Mobile Security ===
ESET Mobile Security is the replacement for ESET Mobile Antivirus, which provided anti-malware and antispam functionality. ESET Mobile Security contains all the features of the older product and adds new anti-theft features such as SIM locking and remote wipe as well as a security audit and a firewall. Versions for Windows Mobile and Symbian OS were available as of September 2010, for both home and enterprise users.

=== Remote Administrator ===
ESET Remote Administrator is a central management console designed to allow network administrators to manage ESET software across a corporate network.

=== Smart Security ===
On November 5, 2007, ESET released an Internet security suite, ESET Smart Security version 3.0, to compete with other security suites by other companies such as McAfee, Symantec, AVG and Kaspersky. ESET Smart Security incorporates anti-spam and a bidirectional firewall along with traditional anti-malware features of ESET NOD32 Antivirus.

On March 2, 2009, ESET Smart Security version 4.0 was released, adding integration of ESET SysInspector; support for Mozilla Thunderbird and Windows Live Mail; a new self-defense module, an updated firewall module, ESET SysRescue and a wizard for creating bootable CD and USB flash drives. There were initially compatibility problems between ESET Smart Security 4.0 and Windows Vista Service Pack 2 but these were remedied by an update.

On August 17, 2010, ESET Smart Security version 4.2 was released with new features, enhancements and changes.

On September 14, 2011, ESET Smart Security version 5.0 was released.

On January 15, 2013, ESET Smart Security version 6.0 was released. This version included Anti-Theft feature for tracking of lost, misplaced or stolen laptop.

On October 16, 2013, ESET Smart Security version 7.0 was released. It offers enhanced operation memory scanning and blocks misuses of known exploits.

On October 2, 2014, ESET Smart Security version 8.0 was released. It adds exploit blocking for Java and botnet protection.

On October 13, 2015, ESET Smart Security version 9.0 was released.

==== Post-2015 Developments ====
ESET Smart Security was replaced by ESET HOME Security Premium, which retained all features of Smart Security Premium while adding new enhancements. Existing subscriptions remained functional until expiration.

The latest version of ESET Smart Security Premium (under the ESET HOME umbrella) is 18.2.17.0, released on August 14, 2025. It includes Microphone Monitor alerting users when applications access the microphone, Ransomware Remediation to help recover files encrypted by ransomware, and Enhanced Browser Protection to safeguard browser user profiles from data theft.

=== SysInspector ===
ESET SysInspector is a diagnostic tool which allows in-depth analysis of various aspects of the operating system, including running processes, registry content, startup items and network connections. Anti-Stealth Technology is used to discover hidden objects (rootkits) in the Master Boot Record, boot sector, registry entries, drivers, services and processes. SysInspector Logs are standard XML files and can be submitted to IT experts for further analysis. Two logs can be compared to find a set of items not common to both logs. A log file can be saved as a service script for removing malicious objects from a computer.

=== SysRescue Live ===
ESET SysRescue Live is a Linux-based bootable Live CD/USB image that can be used to boot and clean heavily infected computers independent of the installed operating system. The program is offered free of charge, and can download updates if a network connection is present.

=== Other programs ===
ESET has released free standalone removers for malware when they are widespread, such as Mebroot.

== Development ==
=== File Security for Microsoft Windows Server ===
On June 1, 2010, the first release candidate for ESET File Security for Microsoft Windows Server v4.3 was made available to the public. This program is an updated version of ESET NOD32 Antivirus Business Edition designed for Microsoft Windows Server operating systems and contains a revised user interface, automatic exclusions for critical directories and files and unspecified optimizations for operation on servers.

=== Mobile Security ===
On April 22, 2010, ESET Mobile Security for Windows Mobile and Symbian OS went into public beta. The Home Edition was released on September 2, 2010, and on January 20, 2011, the Business Edition went into beta.

On April 29, 2011, ESET a beta test version for Android was released. On August 10, 2011, the release candidate was made available.

=== NOD32 for Mac OS X and Linux Desktop ===
On December 2, 2009, ESET NOD32 Antivirus 4 for Mac OS X Desktop and ESET NOD32 Antivirus 4 for Linux Desktop were released for public testing. ESET stated the release automatically detects and cleans cross-platform malware, scans archives, automatically scans removable media such as USB flash drives when mounted, performs real-time scanning, provides reports and offers a GUI similar to the Microsoft Windows version. The second beta test versions were released January 9, 2010, and the third on June 10, 2010.

On September 13, 2010, ESET released ESET NOD32 Antivirus for Mac OS X Business Edition. and announced a release candidate for ESET Cybersecurity for Mac OS X

On September 24, 2010, ESET released a Release Candidate for ESET Cybersecurity for Mac OS X and on January 21, 2011, ESET released a Release Candidate for ESET NOD32 Antivirus for Linux Desktop

=== Smart Security ===
On May 5, 2011, ESET released a beta test version of ESET Smart Security 5.0. The beta version adds parental control, a cloud-based file reputation service, gamer mode, HIPS and improvements to its antispam, firewall and removable media control functions. On June 14, 2011, ESET released a release candidate for ESET Smart Security version 5.0.

On August 5, 2014, ESET Smart Security version 8.0 public beta 1 was released. It offers enhanced exploit blocking and botnet detection.

== Discontinued products ==
=== Mobile Antivirus ===
ESET Mobile Antivirus was aimed at protecting smartphones from viruses, spyware, adware, trojans, worms, rootkits, and other unwanted software. It also provided antispam filtering for SMS messages. Versions for Windows Mobile and Symbian OS were available. ESET discontinued ESET Mobile Antivirus in January 2011 and provides ESET Mobile Security as a free upgrade to licensed users of ESET Mobile Antivirus.

=== NOD32 Antivirus v2.7 and older ===
On February 1, 2010, ESET discontinued version 2.7 of NOD32 Antivirus and all previous versions of NOD32 Antivirus. They were removed from the ESET website, including product pages and e-Store. Version 2.7 was the last version supporting Microsoft 95/98/ME and Novell NetWare operating systems. Virus signature database updates and customer support was discontinued on February 1, 2012.

== Technical information ==
On a network, NOD32 clients can update from a central "mirror server" on the network.

== Reception ==
As of April 21, 2011, NOD32 Antivirus holds ICSA Labs certifications. As of September 29, 2018, NOD32 has accumulated one hundred eleven VB100 awards from Virus Bulletin; it has only failed to receive this award three times.

In comparative report that Virus Bulletin published on September 2, 2008, NOD32 detected 94.4% of all malware and 94.7% of spyware. It stood above competitors like Norton Internet Security and ZoneAlarm but below Windows Live OneCare and Avira AntiVir. In the RAP averages quadrant between December 2011 and June 2012, Virus Bulletin found that ESET was pretty much at the same level, about 94%, but was noted for its ability to block spam and phishing, earning an award, an award only 19 other antivirus companies were able to acquire.

On April 28, 2008, Robert Vamosi of CNET.com reviewed version 3.0 of NOD32 and gave it a score of 3.5 out of 5. On March 6, 2009, Seth Rosenblatt of Download.com reviewed the 4.0 version of NOD32 gave it a rating of 4.6 out of 5. On September 15, 2011, Seth Rosenblatt of CNET reviewed the 5.0 version of NOD32 and gave it a rating of 5 out of 5.

== See also ==
- Antivirus software
