= G Data CyberDefense =

German software company

G DATA CyberDefense AG
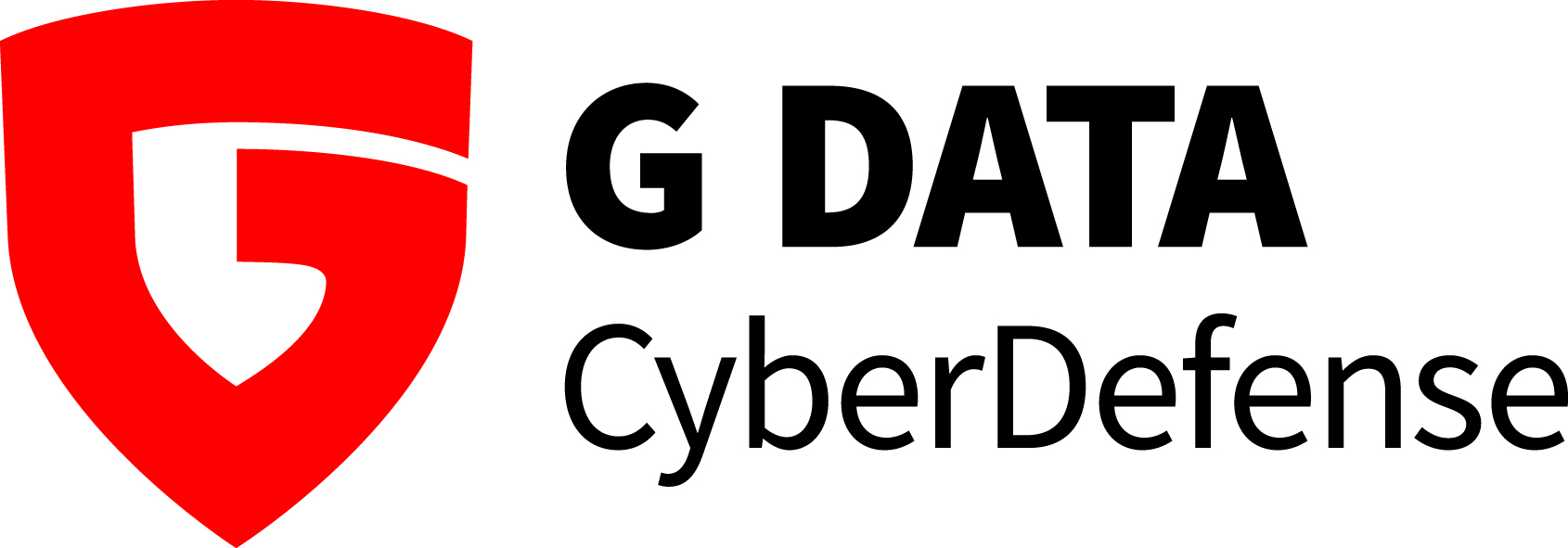

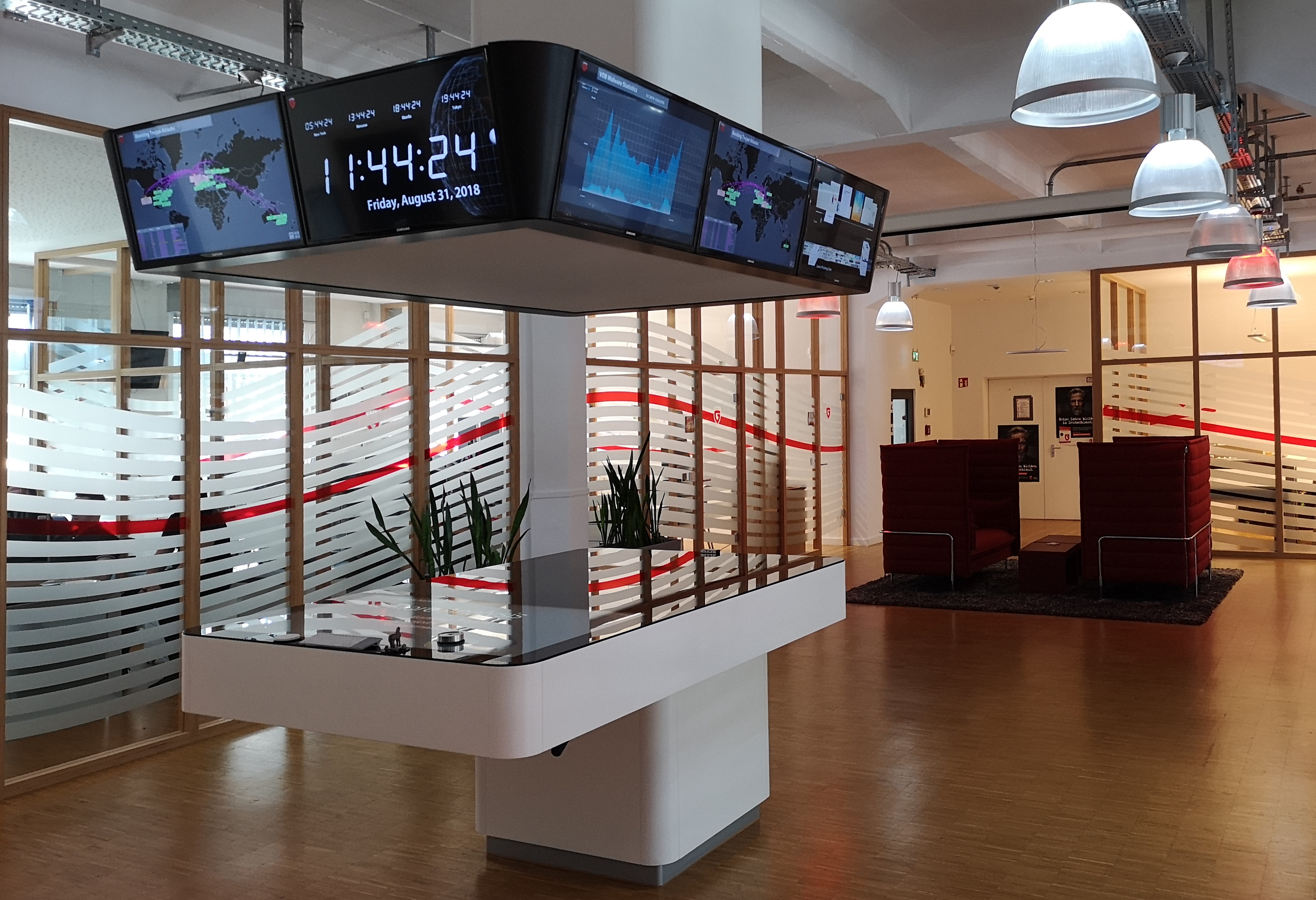
- Inside G Data Campus in Bochum
- Industry: Computer software
- Founded: 1985; 41 years ago
- Headquarters: Bochum, Germany
- Key people: Kai Figge; Andreas Lüning
- Products: Antivirus software
- Revenue: €38.9 million (2021)
- Number of employees: 500
- Website: www.gdata.de/en www.gdata-software.com

G Data CyberDefense AG (until September 2019 G Data Software AG) is a German software company that focuses on computer security. The company was founded in 1985 and is headquartered in Bochum. They are known for being the creators of the world's first antivirus software. G Data uses multiple scanning engines; one is developed in-house and the other is the Bitdefender engine. G Data provides several security products that are targeted at home and business markets. The company has a North American subsidiary located in Newark, Delaware.

== History ==
old logo

=== Antivirus Programs & Cyber Security (1985–2006) ===
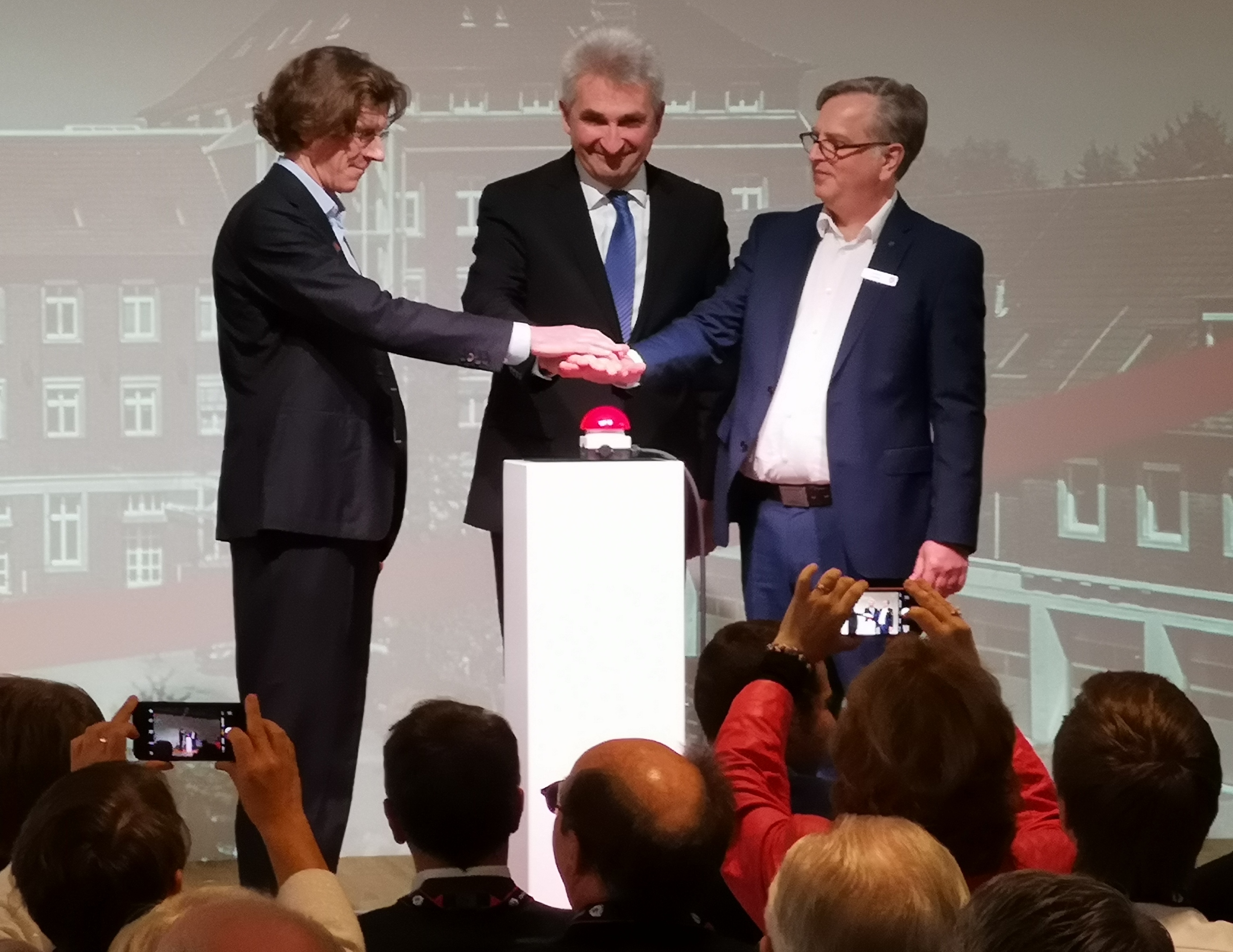
Kai Figge, Andreas Pinkwart and Andreas Lüning at the opening ceremony for the new G Data Campus

G Data was founded in Bochum, Germany, in 1985. The company introduced its first computer security product Anti-Virus Kit (AVK) in 1988 for Atari ST.

In 1990, this program was given a graphical user interface for MS-DOS for the first time. In 1993, G Data developed the software GeoRoute, the first route planner with intelligent mapping. Beside focus on the security market, G Data also created software for voice recognition (Invox) and speech synthesis (Logox).

The antivirus program was continuously developed: in 1995, the first antivirus hardware protection was added, followed by CloudSecurity in 2005. In November 2000, the company was converted into a joint-stock company, and the company fully focused its portfolio on computer security.

In the 2000s, the company expanded significantly, entering markets in various countries and opening a Japanese branch in Tokyo in 2004.

=== Cyber Security for Private Users and Companies (2006–present) ===
In 2007, G Data had around 100 employees. In 2008 and 2009, Brazil and Mexico were added, as well as the USA, Canada, and Russia. In 2009, G Data made around 25 million euros in revenue, and by the summer of 2010, the company had about 300 employees. In 2010, G Data opened a branch in Italy, followed by branches in France, the Netherlands, and Belgium in 2011.

By 2015, the company had about 500 employees and its security solutions were available in 90 countries worldwide. Since that year, G Data has been an exclusive launch partner of the Microsoft Cloud in Germany, which has been available in Germany since mid-2016.

In September 2015, G Data launched a new messaging app called Secure Chat which used the Signal Protocol. The application was based on a fork of Signal and its source code was published under the GPLv3 license. G Data discontinued the service in May 2018.

In September 2019, the annual general meeting decided to change the name from G DATA Software AG to G DATA CyberDefense AG.

In 2021, G Data received the European Cyber Security Organization seal of quality “Cybersecurity Made in Europe”. G Data is a member of Eurobits and the Federal IT Security Association TeleTrusT.

In 2022, G Data was awarded the Comenius EduMedia seal and the eco://award.
