= ThunderByte Antivirus =

Early antivirus software

ThunderBYTE Anti-Virus (TBAV) was an early antivirus software product. It was created by Dutchman Frans Veldman in 1988, and published by his company, ESaSS B.V. It was mainly designed for DOS, but there were also versions supporting Microsoft Windows. TBAV was known for its fast scan speed, heuristics-based scanner, and Anti-Vir.Dat files tracking known-good file information (checksums).

Originally ThunderBYTE used a dedicated ISA card to provide protection before the operating system was even loaded. Later, a software-only product was released, which soon displaced the hardware offering. It was distributed as shareware.

In 1998, TBAV was sold to Norman ASA, which discontinued ThunderBYTE as a product.
