= GTUBE =

Spam testing mechanism

The GTUBE ("Generic Test for Unsolicited Bulk Email") is a 68-byte test string used to test anti-spam systems, in particular those based on SpamAssassin. In SpamAssassin, it carries an anti-spam score of 1000 by default, which would be sufficient to trigger any installation.

The contents of the string are as follows:

XJS*C4JDBQADN1.NSBN3*2IDNEN*GTUBE-STANDARD-ANTI-UBE-TEST-EMAIL*C.34X

and should be placed in the message body of an RFC 5322 compliant email message, without any line breaks or whitespace.

There exist some varieties, notably the NAItube (which will carry a variable weight) and the GTphish (which will trigger specifically as a phishing mail), which are used in the McAfee implementation of SpamAssassin.

== See also ==
- EICAR test file

== Bibliography ==
- "SpamAssassin: The GTUBE". The Apache Software Foundation.
