= Sensofusion =

Finnish technology company

Sensofusion Plc
- Native name: Sensofusion Oyj
- Type: Public limited company (julkinen osakeyhtiö)
- Industry: Technology
- Founded: 2016; 10 years ago
- Founder: Tuomas Rasila
- Headquarters: Finland
- Key people: Tuomas Rasila (CEO and founder); Mikko Hyppönen (Chief Research Officer)
- Products: Drone detection systems, countermeasure equipment and interceptor drones
- Revenue: €20.8 million (2024)
- Operating income: €15.0 million (2024)
- Number of employees: Approx. 100 (2025)
- Website: sensofusion.com

Sensofusion Plc (Note: Known in Finnish as Sensofusion Oyj. Prior to its stock market listing in 2026, the company was known as Sensofusion Ltd and Sensofusion Oy.) is a Finnish technology company founded in 2016 that develops and manufactures detection systems for unmanned aerial vehicles (drones) and airspace security solutions. The company's products have been sold to, among others, the United States Marine Corps, Government of Ukraine, and the United States space agency NASA. Sensofusion's security solutions are also used at several international airports in Europe, as well as to prevent drone-facilitated smuggling into prisons.

Sensofusion's main office is located in Vantaa, Finland. The company also has operations in Ukraine and an office in Canada. The CEO and founder of the company is Tuomas Rasila. In the summer of 2025, it was reported that Mikko Hyppönen had joined Sensofusion as Chief Research Officer.

Sensofusion's main products include passive drone and drone operator detection systems designed for government and defense use with a range of up to 10 kilometres (6.2 mi) (Airfence), as well as high-power drone jammers and interceptor drones (Interceptor). The Airfence 7 detection system can be supplemented with several additional layers, such as antenna systems that extend unmanned aerial vehicle detection range (KELA), to which a radar system can also be connected. Additional capabilities include satellite-based SAR radar reconnaissance detection, and an optical detection system with night vision capability planned for release in 2026.

Sensofusion has grown rapidly during the Russian invasion of Ukraine (2022–). In 2021, the company's revenue was approximately 1.7 million euros and it employed 12 people. Revenue in 2023 was 7.2 million and in 2024 already 20.8 million euros. By 2025, the company employed nearly one hundred people. In autumn 2025, Sensofusion was awarded the 2025 President of the Republic's Internationalization Award.

Sensofusion raised 45 million euros in venture capital from investors in its second funding round. In connection with this, the company was valued at 550 million euros. At the beginning of 2026, it was reported that the company was aiming for an initial public offering, possibly as early as 2026. In August 2026, Sensofusion received an export license from the Finnish Ministry of Defence for a deal to supply ten drone detection and neutralization systems to the United States Secret Service.
