= VirusBuster =

VirusBuster Ltd.
- Company type: Private
- Industry: IT Security, Antivirus Software
- Founded: 1997
- Defunct: 2012
- Headquarters: Hungary
- Products: Antivirus Software, Internet Security Suite, Security Solutions

VirusBuster Ltd. was a Hungarian IT security software vendor. The fully Hungarian owned company developed software under the brand name "VirusBuster" for the Hungarian and international market to protect users' computers from malware programs and other IT security threats. In August 2012, VirusBuster Ltd. announced the discontinuation of its antivirus products.

== History ==
The legal and trade predecessor of the firm began to develop antiviral products at the end of the 1980s. At that time, it released the software product "Virsec", at a time other well known vendors appeared with similar solutions. In 1992, Virsec was renamed to "VirusBuster". At the later official formation of the firm, this name became the name of the company as well.

In 1997 the official foundation of VirusBuster Ltd took place. In the next years, the company produced mainly anti-viral products for the Hungarian market, primarily for the governmental sector.

Between 2000 and 2003 VirusBuster steadily extended its portfolio. The developments manifested in the increasing number of protected platforms and systems, also in new layered security products to target new threats, and in the management system for the firm's security products. With all of these achievements, the company could offer effective security solutions for every organizational customers.

In 2001, the Australian Leprechaun licensed VirusBuster's antiviral technology to integrate it into its own security products. However, Leprechaun ceased operations in 2004.

Between 2003 and 2006, VirusBuster strengthened its Eastern European and worldwide market positions. The antiviral engine of the company became an independent product, and thus it was integrated into several other firms' security solutions. These were the years, when VirusBuster appeared on the American market.

In August 2012, Agnitum, the PC security expert and manufacturer of the Outpost range of security products, had announced the acquisition of antivirus technology and infrastructure from its long-term partner VirusBuster.

In October 2012, the owner of the VirusBuster has made the decision that the products and the services were going to be removed from the market.

=== Products ===
VirusBuster provided customized, virus protection solutions for all customer groups. Furthermore VirusBuster Internet Security Suite provided full IT protection for its home users. The company's security products covered all mainstream operating systems, including both workstation and server platforms.

According to independent IT-professionals and international test labs the products of the company were pretty good solutions, in the aspects of both speed and efficiency. Some security analysts said VirusBuster's user interface is rather too "traditional", but according to others this almost "old fashioned" GUI provides better transparency and easier manageability. According to general opinions, the products of the company covered all important business platforms and protected from every IT security threat.

=== Technology licenses ===
Aside from the retail solutions for different market segments, it was also important for the company that their antiviral engine became an independent product. Several international companies were licensing VirusBuster's technology, and integrated it into their own products. (Outpost Security Suite, Kaspersky, Proteatools)

=== International partnerships ===
- Microsoft
- HP
- Sun Microsystems
- Novell

=== Name misuse ===
In the beginning of 2008 VirusBuster's security researchers found a computer malware package which was using the name of the company to trick users. The worm was spreading itself as an attachment of infected e-mails under the name "virusbuster.personal.v3.20.regfile.by.arcade.exe". The analysis and the classification of the virus was not a very difficult task, since the worm was a variant of the well known and rather old "Bagle" malware family.

This was not the first example of name misuse; VirusBurst was a fake anti-spyware program in 2006. Its name was very similar to VirusBusters' name – probably accidentally, but in this case the similarity was perfect.

Also in 2008 the 29A virus-writing group announced its shut down, and one of the prominent members of the 29A team had also used the 'VirusBuster' alias.

== See also ==
- Antivirus software
