= Péter Szőr =

Hungarian computer security researcher (1970–2013)

- Born: Péter Szőr; 17 July 1970; Balatonfüred, Veszprém County, Hungary
- Died: 12 November 2013 (aged 43); California
- Education: University of Pannonia
- Occupations: Computer virus and security researcher, entrepreneur, author
- Years active: 1990–2013

Péter Szőr (17 July 1970 – 12 November 2013) was a Hungarian computer virus and security researcher, entrepreneur and author.

Born in Balatonfüred, Veszprém County, Szőr began an interest in computer viruses in 1990. A University of Pannonia graduate, he authored several virus-related books, and was renowned for his work. From 2011 until his death, he worked for a McAfee antivirus firm working on a new solution to stop viruses.

Péter Szőr died on 12 November 2013, aged 43. In May 2014, Virus Bulletin introduced the Péter Szőr Award to be given annually in recognition of the best piece of technical security research done that year.
