= Jon Oberheide =

American computer scientist

- Education: PhD
- Alma mater: University of Michigan
- Occupations: Computer scientist, Entrepreneur
- Website: jon.oberheide.org

Jon Oberheide is an American computer scientist and entrepreneur in the field of cybersecurity. He is the founder of Duo Security, a security firm that was later purchased by Cisco. He also sits on the board of directors for numerous companies.

== Biography ==
Oberheide grew up in Troy, Michigan and began fixing people's computers when he was only in middle school. While attending high school, Oberheide founded a web hosting business with his friends, and would scrape the internet for email addresses in order to find potential clients. He would also hack networks as a challenge to see if they were secured. At the age of 17, he hacked into a honeypot set up by Dug Song, a security expert and future Duo Security co-founder who set up the honeypot to lure talented hackers.

Oberheide attended the University of Michigan where he earned a PhD in CSE. During his studies, he worked with Farnam Jahanian and discovered multiple flaws in Android devices. He is also credited with proposing the first Cloud-based antivirus design in 2008. In 2010, Oberheide (along with Song) founded Duo Security, a security firm that was purchased by Cisco in 2018 for $2.3 billion. Oberheide served as the company's CTO. During his career, he has obtained more than 70 patents related to cybersecurity.

Oberheide sits on the board of several startups and non-profit organizations, including DNSFilter, runZero, Push Security, and The Henry Ford.
