= European Institute for Computer Antivirus Research =

Voluntary association

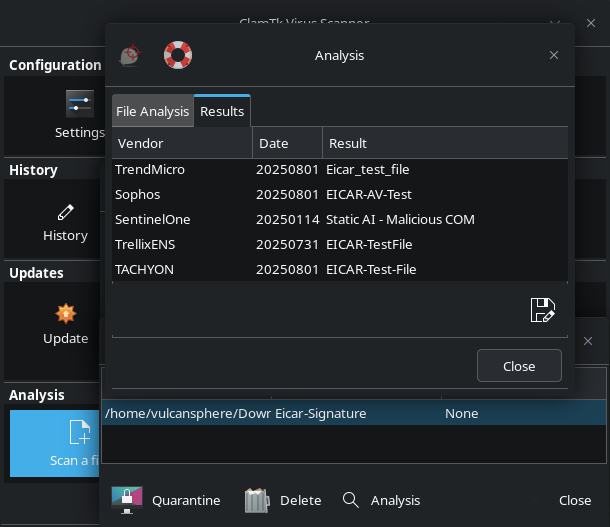
ClamTk scanning an EICAR test file

The European Institute for Computer Antivirus Research (EICAR) was founded in 1991 as an organization aiming to further antivirus research and improving development of antivirus software. Recently EICAR has furthered its scope to include the research of malicious software (malware) other than computer viruses and extended work on other information security topics like content security, Wireless LAN security, RFID and information security awareness. EICAR also runs a number of ongoing projects and working groups or 'task forces', including the EICAR Product Cybersecurity Standard and working group WG2 on anti-virus systems administration.

== Acronym ==
"EICAR" was originally an abbreviation for "European Institute for Computer Antivirus Research", but the organisation no longer uses that full title, and now regards "EICAR" as a self-standing name, as it has expanded into a broader range of IT Security work than just antivirus research.

== EICAR test file ==
EICAR, in collaboration with CARO (Computer AntiVirus Research Organization), developed the EICAR test file: a 68-byte file with a .com extension, which is a harmless executable string that tests the integrity of anti-virus software.

== See also ==
- Anti-Malware Testing Standards Organization
