= Avira =

German computer security software company

Coordinates: 47°39′42.613″N 9°35′31.371″E

Avira Operations GmbH & Co. KG
- Type: Subsidiary
- Industry: Computer software
- Founded: Germany (1986)
- Founder: Tjark Auerbach
- Headquarters: Tettnang, Germany
- Key people: Travis Witteveen – CEO
- Products: Security software
- Revenue: 68,752,960.49 (2017)
- Net income: 1,551,187.96 (2017)
- Number of employees: 500+
- Parent: Gen Digital
- Website: www.avira.com

Avira Operations GmbH & Co. KG is a German multinational computer security software company mainly known for its Avira Free Security antivirus software. Although founded in 2006, the Avira antivirus application has been under active development since 1986 through its predecessor company H+BEDV Datentechnik GmbH. Since 2021, Avira has been owned by American software company NortonLifeLock (now Gen Digital), which also operates Norton, Avast and AVG. It was previously owned by investment firm Investcorp.

The company also has offices in the United States, China, Romania, and Japan.

== Technology ==
=== Virus definition ===
Avira periodically "cleans out" its virus definition files, replacing specific signatures with generic ones for a general increase in performance and scanning speed. A 15 MB database clean-out was made on 27 October 2008, causing problems to the users of the Free edition because of its large size and Avira's slow Free edition servers. Avira responded by reducing the size of the individual update files, delivering less data in each update. Nowadays there are 32 smaller definition files that are updated regularly in order to avoid peaks in the download of the updates.

Its file-by-file scanning feature has jokingly been titled "Luke Filewalker" by the developers, as a reference to the Star Wars media franchise character "Luke Skywalker".

=== Advanced heuristic ===
Avira products contain heuristics that proactively uncover unknown malware, before a special virus signature to combat the damaging element has been created and before a virus guard update has been sent.

Heuristic virus detection involves extensive analysis and investigation of the affected codes for functions typical of malware. If the code being scanned exhibits these characteristic features it is reported as being suspicious, although not necessarily malware; the user decides whether to act on or ignore the warning.

=== ProActiv ===
The ProActiv component uses rule sets developed by the Avira Malware Research Center to identify suspicious behavior. The rule sets are supplied by Avira databases. ProActiv sends information on suspicious programs to the Avira databases for logging.

=== Firewall ===
Avira removed its own firewall technology in 2014, with protection supplied instead by Windows Firewall (Windows 7 and after), because Windows 8, and later the Microsoft Certification Program, forces developers to use interfaces introduced in Windows Vista.

=== Protection Cloud ===
Avira Protection Cloud (APC) was first introduced in version 2013. It uses information available via the Internet (cloud computing) to improve detection and affect system performance less. This technology was implemented in all paid 2013 products. APC was initially only used during a manual quick system scan; later it was extended to real-time protection.

=== System requirements ===
Windows: operating system Windows 7, 8/8.1, 10, 11; processor speed 1.6 GHz; requires 256 MB of RAM; hard disk memory 2 GB. Mac: operating system MacOS 10.15 (Catalina) or higher; 500 MB free hard disk space

== Partners ==
Avira offers its antivirus engine in the form of a software development kit to implement in complementary products. Strategic and technology partners of Avira include Canonical, CYAN Networks, IBM, intelligence AG, Microsoft, novell, OPSWAT, Synergy Systems and others.

On 4 September 2014, Avira announced a partnership with Dropbox, to combine Avira's security with Dropbox's "sync and share" capabilities.

Tjark Auerbach, the founder of Avira sold almost 100% of his stake in the company to the Investcorp Group of Manama (Bahrain) in April 2020. The stakes were reportedly sold at a price of 180 million dollars. The Investcorp Group has invested in several other firms from the cybersecurity sector in the past. The directors of Investcorp Group belong to several royal families of Middle East countries like Kuwait, Bahrain, Saudi Arabia, etc. However, 20% of its total ordinary and preferred shares are owned by the Abu Dhabi-based Mubadala Group since 2017.

On 7 December 2020, Gen Digital announced acquisition of Avira for approximately US$360 million from Investcorp Technology Partners. The acquisition was closed in January 2021.

In February 2021, BullGuard joined Avira as part of Gen Digital Inc.

== Products ==
=== Windows ===
Avira Free Antivirus
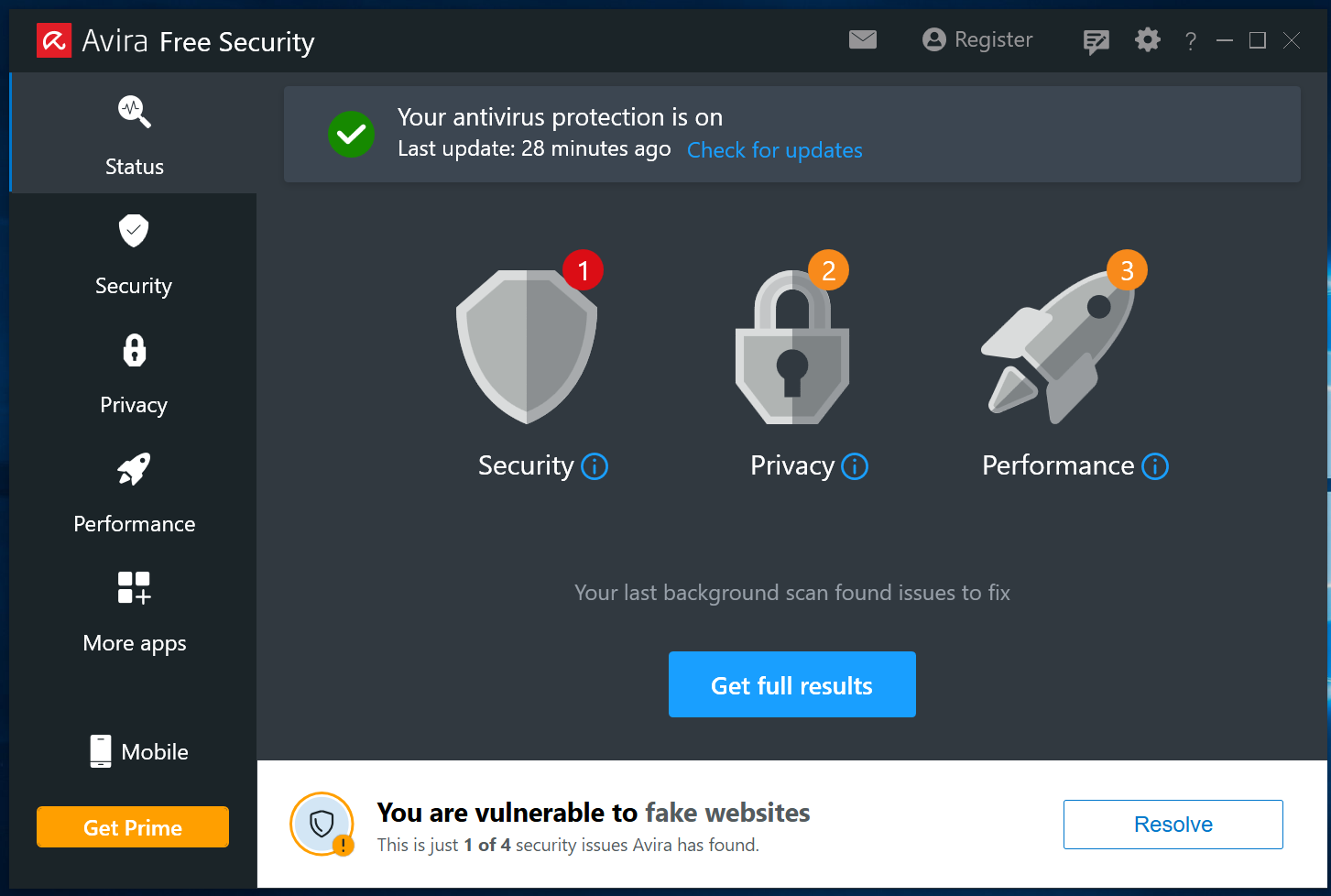
- Avira Free Security 2025 in Windows 10
- Original author: H+BEDV Datentechnik GmbH.
- Developer: Gen Digital Inc.
- Release: 1988
- Stable release: 1.1.107, 2025
- Operating system: Windows 10 and later
- Available in: English, German, French, Spanish, Italian, Portuguese, Russian, Dutch, Turkish, Japanese, and Chinese
- Type: Antivirus software
- License: Freemium
- Website: https://www.avira.com/

Avira offers the following security products and tools for Microsoft Windows:

- Avira Free Security: The free edition antivirus/anti-spyware, for non-commercial use, with promotional pop-ups.
- Avira Internet Security: The premium edition antivirus/anti-spyware.
- Avira Prime: A bundle of Avira's tools.

=== MacOS ===
- Avira Free Mac Security for Mac: Runs on MacOS 10.9 and above.

=== Android and iOS ===
Avira offers the following security applications for mobile devices running Android and iOS:

- Avira Antivirus Security for Android: Free application for Android, runs on versions 2.2 and above.
- Avira Antivirus Security Pro for Android: Premium edition for Android, runs on versions 2.2 and above. Available as an upgrade from within the free application, it provides additional safe browsing, hourly update and free tech support.
- Avira Mobile Security for iOS: Free edition for iOS devices, such as iPhone and iPad.

=== Other products ===
- Avira Phantom VPN: Avira's virtual private network software for Android, iOS, macOS and Windows.
- Avira Prime: In April 2017 Avira launched a single-user, multi-device subscription-based product designed to provide a complete set of all Avira products available for the duration of the license along with premium support.

Avira Prime is compatible with Windows, macOS, iOS, and Android operating systems and related devices and is available to consumers in 5- and 25-device editions, dubbed "Avira Prime" and "Avira Prime Unlimited" respectively. Subscriptions are in 30-day and 1-year increments.

=== Discontinued platforms ===
Avira formerly offered free antivirus software for Unix and Linux. It was discontinued in 2013, although updates were supplied until June 2016.

== Security vulnerabilities ==
In 2005, Avira was hit by ACE archive buffer overflow vulnerability. A remote attacker could have exploited this vulnerability by crafting an ACE archive and delivering it via a malicious web page or e-mail. A buffer overflow could occur when Avira scanned the malicious archive. That would have allowed the attacker to execute arbitrary code on the affected system.

In 2010, Avira Management Console was hit by the use-after-free remote code execution vulnerability. The vulnerability allowed remote attackers to execute arbitrary code on vulnerable installations of Avira Management Console. Authentication was not required to exploit the vulnerability.

In 2013, Avira engines were hit by a 0-day vulnerability that allowed attackers to get access to a customer's PC. The bug was found in the avipbb.sys driver file and allowed privilege escalation.

== Awards and reviews ==
In January 2008, Anti-Malware Test Lab gave Avira "gold" status for proactive virus detection and detection/removal of rootkits.

AV-Comparatives awarded Avira its "AV Product of the Year" award in its "Summary Report 2008."

In April 2009, PC Pro awarded Avira Premium Security Suite 9 the maximum six stars and a place on its A-list for Internet security software.

In August 2009, Avira performed at a 98.9% percent overall malware detection rate, and was the fastest for both on-demand scans and on-access scans conducted by PC World magazine, which ranked it first on its website. Avira was among the first companies to receive OESIS OK Gold Certification, indicating that both the antispyware and antivirus components of several of its security products achieved the maximum compatibility score with widespread network technologies such as SSL/TLS VPN and network access control from companies including Juniper Networks, Cisco Systems, and SonicWALL.

In February 2010, testing by firm AV-TEST, Avira tied for first place (with another German company) in the "malware on demand" detection test and earned a 99% score in the "adware/spyware on demand" test.

AV-Comparatives gave Avira its Silver award (for 99.5% detection rate) in its "Summary Report 2010."

For 2012, AV-Comparatives awarded Avira with "gold" status for its 99.6% performance in the "On-Demand Malware Detection" category and classified Avira as a "Top Rated" product overall for that year.

In the AV-Comparatives August 2014 "Real-World Protection Test," with 669 total test cases tried against various security products, Avira tied for first place.

AV-Comparatives awarded Avira its "AV Product of the Year" award in its "Summary Report 2016."

AV-Test awarded Avira its "TOP Product" award in its "May-Jun/2022 Testing"

== See also ==
- Comparison of virtual private network services
