= CARO =

Organization which research and study malwares

CARO (Computer Antivirus Research Organization) is an organization that was established in 1990 to research and study malware.

The organization is perhaps best known for the Virus Naming Convention of 1991 (with subsequent revisions). Though widely adopted, it still faced usage obstacles. This has led to proposal of new naming systems from product vendors and industry groups.

The annual workshop is the biggest CARO event. The workshop is usually organized and hosted by one anti-virus firm in their home country. Workshops started in 2007 and the attendance is limited to 120-130 top anti-malware experts with a strict policy of no photography or recordings of any kind:

- 2007: Reykjavik, Iceland (organized by F-Prot)
- 2008: Hoofddorp, The Netherlands (Norman)
- 2009: Budapest, Hungary (Virus Buster)
- 2010: Helsinki, Finland (F-Secure)
- 2011: Prague, Czech Republic (AVAST Software)
- 2012: Munich, Germany (Trend Micro and McAfee)
- 2013: Bratislava, Slovakia (ESET)
- 2014: Melbourne, FL, USA (Florida Institute of Technology)
- 2015: Hamburg, Germany (Trend Micro)
- 2016: Bucharest, Romania (Avira)
- 2017: Krakow, Poland (ESET)
- 2018: Portland, OR, USA (AMTSO)
- 2019: Copenhagen, Denmark (CSIS Security Group)
- 2020: Online (G Data), due to Covid-19 the workshop was cancelled last minute. For those that wanted or needed to present, there was a 1-day mini-CARO-workshop online.
- 2022: Brno, Czech Republic (Avast)
- 2023: Bochum, Germany (G Data)
- 2024: Arlington, USA (Cyber Threat Alliance)
- 2026: Innsbruck, Austria (AV-Comparatives)

== EICAR test file ==
CARO, in collaboration with EICAR (European Institute for Computer Antivirus Research), developed the EICAR test file, an executable string designed to test the integrity of antivirus software.

== Members ==
CARO membership is a private issue with members choosing to publicize their membership or not.

Members of CARO, founders and not, current or not, who have publicly stated their membership at some point include: Friðrik Skúlason (founder of FRISK Software International), Dr. Alan Solomon (founder of Dr Solomon's Antivirus Toolkit), Vesselin Bontchev, Mikko Hyppönen (CRO of F-Secure), Eugene Kaspersky (founder of Kaspersky Lab), Nick FitzGerald, Peter Ferrie, Dmitry Gryaznov, Igor Muttik, Atley Padgett Peterson, Costin Raiu, Peter Kruse, Morton Swimmer, Righard Zwienenberg and Philipp Wolf.
