= Bitdefender =

Romanian cybersecurity technology company

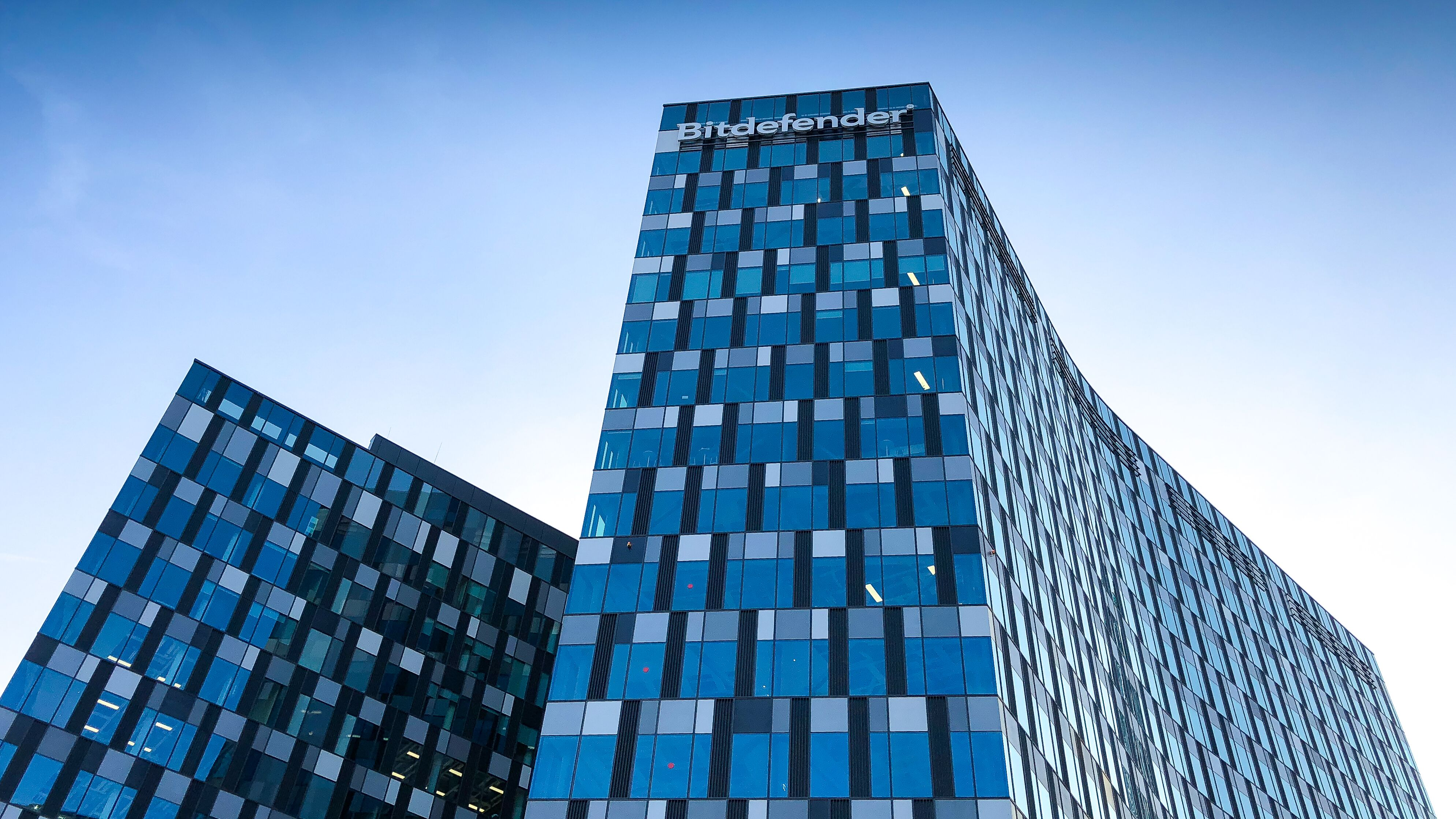
- Bitdefender Headquarters in Bucharest, Romania
- Type: Private
- Industry: Computer software
- Founded: November 6, 2001; 25 years ago
- Founder: Florin Talpeș
- Headquarters: Bucharest, Romania
- Area served: Worldwide
- Key people: Florin Talpeș (CEO)
- Products: Cybersecurity software
- Services: Computer security
- Revenue: ▲€330 million (2024)
- Number of employees: 2,000+ (2026)
- Website: https://www.bitdefender.com/

Bitdefender is a global cybersecurity technology company founded and headquartered in Bucharest, Romania, with offices in the United States, Europe, Australia, the Middle East, and the Asia-Pacific (APAC) region.

The company was founded in 2001 by current CEO and main shareholder, Florin Talpeș. Bitdefender develops cybersecurity software and services for consumers and organizations worldwide. Its products for individuals and families use artificial intelligence and other technologies to protect against scams, device threats, privacy risks, and identity theft, while its business solutions include endpoint security, threat intelligence, and managed detection and response services.

Bitdefender products are distributed both online and through partners in over 170 countries, and the US market is estimated to generate more than 40% of its revenue. As of 2026, the company employed more than 2,000 people worldwide.

== History ==
Bitdefender software was originally developed by SOFTWIN, a company founded in 1990 in post-communist Romania. It was originally sold as AVX (Antivirus Expert) from 1996 until 2001, when the Bitdefender subsidiary was created and AVX was rebranded under the Bitdefender name. In 2007, Bitdefender became a separate business entity with external capital entry, with Axxess Capital Investment Fund as a key shareholder.

Old logo of the company

From 2004 to 2015, the company expanded with offices in the United States, Germany, United Kingdom, Denmark, and the Middle East.

In 2017, the company acquired French partner Profil Technology. British fund Vitruvian Partners would then buy a 30% stake in the company, putting its valuation over $600 million.

In 2018, Bitdefender opened a new subsidiary in Australia through acquisition of assets from SMS eTech. That year, the company also acquired behavioral and network security analysis company RedSocks.

Bitdefender opened a Security Operations Center in San Antonio, Texas in 2019. The SOC serves as a headquarters for the company's managed detection and response services, and operates as part of a global network with additional SOCs in Romania and Singapore. Bitdefender analysts use telemetry from the company’s threat intelligence engines to identify, investigate, and respond to threats.

Bitdefender signed a multi-year partnership deal with Scuderia Ferrari on September 28, 2022. The partnership expanded in 2023 to include integration of Bitdefender Advanced Threat Intelligence into all of Ferrari’s operational systems. In October 2025, Bitdefender extended its partnership with Scuderia Ferrari HP through 2028.

In August 2023, Bitdefender acquired Singapore-based Horangi Cyber Security, expanding its managed detection & response services and absorbing Horangi's team of experts.

Bitdefender announced the launch of Bitdefender Voyager Ventures, a corporate venture capital unit, in April 2024. The venture invests in early-stage cybersecurity and AI startups, including Validaitor, a spinoff of the Karlsruhe Institute of Technology.

In May 2024, Bitdefender and NinjaOne announced a partnership to integrate their security software into a single product suite. Bitdefender also has a partnership with the San Antonio Spurs to provide cybersecurity services, and partners with Arrow Electronics to offer its subscription-based services.

In February 2025, Bitdefender acquired a division of Bitshield responsible for distributing Bitdefender products and services in Malaysia and Brunei.

In June 2025, Bitdefender announced an agreement to acquire Irish email security technology company Mesh Security Limited. Financial terms of the transaction were not disclosed. Mesh’s capabilities was expected to be incorporated into Bitdefender’s existing security platforms, pending regulatory approval.

=== Fighting cybercrime ===
In 2014, Bitdefender built an AI model that successfully blocked the WannaCry ransomware attack in 2017.

Since 2016, Bitdefender has advised Europol’s European Cybercrime Centre (EC3) in supporting investigations into online criminal activity. Bitdefender joined the No More Ransom initiative in 2016, releasing free decryption tools for victims of ransom attacks to decrypt their devices without having to pay to do so. This included releasing a free universal decryption kit for users affected by the GandCrab ransomware attack in 2018.

In 2016, Bitdefender advised the FBI, the DEA, and the Dutch National Police (with the support of Europol) during Operation Bayonet, culminating in the shutdown of the AlphaBay and Hansa black markets in 2017.

In 2018, Bitdefender joined the Cybersecurity Tech Accord, and in 2019, provided operational support to the European Cybercrime Centre, helping shut down the Sipulimarket and Silkktie darknet markets.

Bitdefender's 2020 research into the Interplanetary Storm botnet proxy network was provided to law enforcement ahead of the FBI dismantling the network in November 2023.

In September 2023, Bitdefender provided support to Finnish authorities contributing to the seizure of the PIILOPUOTI dark web marketplace. In May 2024, Bitdefender was a supporting partner for Europol's Operation Endgame, which Europol called the largest operation ever against bots, including IcedID, SystemBC, Pikabot, Smokeloader and Bumblebee. It led to the takedown of over 100 servers, and four arrests worldwide. The next phase of Operation Endgame, which took place between November 10 and 13, 2025, led to 1,025 servers being taken down, disrupting credential theft, crypto wallet compromise, and other online attacks affecting hundreds of thousands of victims.

In May 2024, Bitdefender joined the Global Anti-Scam Alliance (GASA), as a foundational member. GASA is a cross-sector international organization that brings together a consortium of governments, law enforcement agencies, consumer protection bodies, financial institutions, and technology companies to better understand, prevent, and respond to scams.

Researchers for Bitdefender provided Finnish customs with information to help shut down the Sipulitie Tor marketplace in October 2024.

== Products and services ==
Bitdefender's original antivirus software was sold as Antivirus Expert until 2001, when it was rebranded under the Bitdefender name.In 2011, Bitdefender expanded and split its service lines into consumer and enterprise security products.

=== Consumer ===
Bitdefender's consumer products are offered for individual users, families, and small businesses, and cover Windows, Mac OS, iOS, and Android.They are sold in tiers, including Bitdefender Ultimate Security, which combines device security, scam protection, privacy tools including a VPN, and identity protection.Family plans cover multiple users through separate accounts and include parental controls. Subscriptions are managed through an online portal, called Bitdefender Central.

Identity theft protection, included in the highest tier and offered in the United States, monitors public records, data broker listings, and sources of breached data for a subscriber's personal information, and provides credit monitoring, assistance with restoring a stolen identity, and reimbursement for certain losses. Personal information exposed in data breaches is frequently used to make fraudulent messages appear legitimate, a technique associated with targeted phishing.

In December 2023, Bitdefender released Scamio, a free chatbot that uses artificial intelligence to assess messages, links, and images for signs of fraud. It was subsequently integrated into Facebook Messenger, WhatsApp, and Discord.

In October 2024, the company said it was consolidating its scam detection technologies into a platform called Scam Copilot, later rebranded as Scam Protection and bundled with selected products; these include Scam Radar, a mobile feature that alerts users to active scam campaigns.In 2025, Bitdefender added Call Blocking for Android and introduced Scam Wave Alerts, which notify users about active scam campaigns in their geographic region.

The company also distributes free tools, including Bitdefender Antivirus Free (which was given a major structural overhaul when the company replaced the retired legacy version with a completely new version built from the ground up), Link Checker, Password Generator, as well as free decryption tools for victims of ransomware attacks, including for the BitLocker-abusing ShrinkLocker ransomware in 2024.

=== Small business ===
Bitdefender's small business portfolio includes products and services ranging from consumer-oriented solutions commonly used by start-ups and microbusinesses, to dedicated business products designed specifically for organizational security needs.

Bitdefender Ultimate Small Business Security, released in 2024, adapts the company's consumer technologies to micro and small businesses.It offers multi-platform device protection and is administered through the same Bitdefender Central portal used by consumer subscribers. The suite also includes email protection and monitoring of exposed company or employees' data, alongside an unlimited VPN client, password manager and AI-powered scam detection.

Bitdefender GravityZone Small Business Security is part of the company's business product line and is deployed and administered from the GravityZone Control Center, which is the cloud console where administrators define security policies, deploy the endpoint agent remotely, and review centralized threat reporting across workstations and servers.

=== Enterprise ===
Bitdefender's endpoint security products are managed through the GravityZone platform. The company also offers an extended detection and response (XDR) platform and additional security services.

GravityZone expanded in 2025 to include PHASR (Proactive Hardening and Attack Surface Reduction), which allows for dynamic, individualized security configurations.

=== Artificial intelligence ===
In May 2022, Bitdefender researchers made available over 25,000 AI agents trained on 60 Atari games to help other researchers with imitation and multi-task learning.

== Controversies and incidents ==
=== Trojan.FakeAlert.5 ===
On March 20, 2010, computers running Bitdefender under 64-bit versions of Windows were affected by a malfunctioning update that classified every executable program as well as DLL files as infected. These files were all marked as 'Trojan.FakeAlert.5' and were moved into quarantine. This action led to software and systems malfunctions that affected users globally. Bitdefender representatives announced the removal of the faulty update and a workaround for the users affected, except for those using the 2008 version.

=== DarkSide ransomware ===
In 2020, hacker group DarkSide switched its main encryption ransomware product over to an "affiliate" model wherein other attackers could download and use its software in exchange for a portion of the profits. However, it introduced a bug in the process where affiliate hackers would all use the same private RSA key - meaning that a decryption package for a single target who paid the ransom would work on any target that had the ransomware installed. Security researchers noticed and were quietly already helping victims of the software, but with no public notice, making it so that the attackers would only see an inexplicable decrease in ransom payments that could be written off as chance.

Months later, Bitdefender publicly released a decryptor of its own development and issued a blog post describing the flaw. Security researchers studying the Colonial Pipeline cyberattack in May 2021 criticized Bitdefender for using the bug as a brief burst of publicity, though they acknowledged that DarkSide would’ve eventually noticed and fixed the issue. Bitdefender defended its actions, saying it only wished to notify as many organizations as possible, triggering a discussion among cybersecurity professionals about the pros and cons of publicly disclosing such vulnerabilities in malware: while the provision of free decryption tools may provide relief for some ransomware victims (who might otherwise not receive free and timely help from experts), their usefulness is short-lived as hackers use these same tools to improve and develop new ransomware software.

Since the creation of its free Darkside Ransomware Decryption Tool, Bitdefender has continued to provide free decryption and recovery tools to the general public on 'multiple occasions', the latest being February 2023.

== Awards ==
- 2023 – AV-TEST Top Product, Best Protection, Best Android Protection, and Best MacOS Security
- 2023 – AV-Comparatives Outstanding Security Award
- 2023, 2024 – Representative Vendor for Managed Detection and Response, Gartner Market Guide
- 2023, 2024, 2025 – Visionary, Gartner Magic Quadrant for Endpoint Protection
- 2024 – AV-Comparatives Top Product Award
- 2024 – Leader in Endpoint Security, The Forrester Wave
- 2024, 2025 – Named one of PCMag's Best Tech Brands. Four products, including Bitdefender Ultimate Security, also maintained Editor’s Choice status in 2024.
- 2025 - Leader in Consumer Life Digital Protection, IDC MarketScape

== See also ==
- Multiscanning
