= Anti-Malware Testing Standards Organization =

Cybersecurity organisation

Anti-Malware Testing Standards Organization (AMTSO) is an international non-profit organization set up in 2008 to address a perceived need for improvement in the quality, relevance and objectivity of anti-malware testing methodologies.

== Stated objectives ==
According to the AMTSO web site, the organization's charter lists the following objectives:

- Providing a forum for discussions related to the testing of anti-malware and related products.
- Developing and publicizing objective standards and best practices for testing of anti-malware and related products.
- Promoting education and awareness of issues related to the testing of anti-malware and related products.
- Providing tools and resources to aid standards-based testing methodologies.

== Organization ==
Until 2012 AMTSO was administered by an elected and unpaid Board of Directors, with strategic and other input from an Advisory Board, and six committees to handle specific operations such as membership, fees, PR and so on. Subsequently, a major infrastructural change took place, introducing an executive team with a CEO, CTO, CFO and VPs of Marketing and Strategy in addition to the already existing Board.

== Board of Directors ==
As of 2023 the Board of Directors constitutes 50% vendor, 50% tester membership and comprises the following:

- Co-Chair: Luis Corrons (Vendor: Gen)
- Co-Chair: Simon Edwards (Tester: SE Labs)
- David Ellis (Tester: SecureIQLab)
- Vladislav Iliushin (Vendor: ELLIO Technology)
- Jesse Song (Tester: SKD Labs)
- Alexander Vukcevic (Vendor: Gen)
- Jeffrey Wu (Tester: Testing Ground Labs)
- Glaucia Young (Vendor: Microsoft)

== Membership ==
While it grew out of discussions between security vendors and security product testing organizations, membership of AMTSO is also open to academics, reviewers, publications, and does include some individual members. However, the high cost of full membership generally discourages individual members and small organizations from joining, and in early 2011, the organization offered a much cheaper subscription rate that didn't, however, offer full voting rights. AMTSO currently offers a two-tier membership model: entity members get full benefits of membership, while individual members get the same benefits apart from the right to vote.

Security tester members have included:

- AV-Comparatives*
- AV-Test*
- Dennis Technology Labs (no longer operating)
- ICSA Labs* (no longer operating)
- MRG Effitas
- NSS Labs (no longer operating)
- SDK Labs*
- SE Labs*
- SecureIQLab
- Testing Ground Labs
- Virus Bulletin*
- West Coast Labs* (no longer operating)

* Each of these labs is accepted by Microsoft as an "industry standard organization" for the purposes of independent certification.

=== Membership controversy ===
Some members of the wider security community and even testers have raised issue with the organization's membership, which includes a preponderance of security vendors. This has led to some tester members leaving and then sometimes rejoining the organization.

Tester member NSS Labs sued AMTSO, as well as CrowdStrike, ESET and Symantec, in an anti-trust case that was later dismissed. Shortly thereafter NSS Labs ceased operation.

== Work ==
The organization has created some potentially useful resources for testers, including a page that flags relevant papers and other resources outside AMTSO, and a repository of guidelines documents for the benefit of aspiring testers on a wide range of topics. Another popular freely available resource is the Security Features Check, which attempts to download a faux malicious file to a desktop or Android device. This is a simple test to ensure that basic anti-malware standards are implemented on the test device.

It also organizes workshops three times a year: discussion and generation of guidelines documents are a major by-product of these sessions.
