= AV-Comparatives =

Austrian organization that tests antivirus software

AV-Comparatives is an Austrian independent organization that tests and assesses antivirus software, regularly releasing charts and reports that are freely available to the public and the media. Antivirus vendors have to meet various requirements regarding trustworthiness and reliability in order to take part in the tests.

AV-Comparatives issues relevant awards, based on antivirus software's comprehensive performance according to multiple testing criteria. It is also supported by the University of Innsbruck and other academic bodies from around the world, as well as by the Austrian Federal Government and the regional government of Tirol.

== Real World Protection Test ==
The AV-Comparatives "Real World Protection Test" is a test environment that closely approximates how well an antivirus product will protect real-world users. Test results are released monthly (from March to June and August to November). Two detailed overall result reports are released in June and December. The Real World Protection Test framework was recognized by the "Standortagentur Tirol" with the 2012 Cluster Award for innovation in computer science.

== Latest Test Series ==
In 2018 AV-Comparatives started with a large scale Enterprise Security Software Test Series, consisting of a Real-World Test, a False Alarm Test, a Malware Protection Test and a Performance Test as well as a review.

== Listing of tests and reviews by AV-Comparatives ==
- Anti-Phishing (software) Test
- Corporate / Enterprise Security Reviews
- False Alarm Test
- File Detection Tests
- Heuristic analysis / Behaviour Test
- Mac Security Reviews / Tests
- Malware Protection Test
- Malware Removal Test
- Mobile Security Review
- Parental Control Test
- Performance Test
- PowerShell-based File-less Attacks and File-based Exploits Test
- Real-World Protection Tests

== Operating systems used for antivirus tests ==
- Microsoft Windows
- macOS
- iOS
- Android
- Linux

== AVC UnDroid Analyzer ==
AV-Comparatives has provided "UnDroid APK Analyzer" as a free service for its website's users since May 2013. Designed for Android smartphone users, it provides a static analysis of Android apps. Users can upload an Android application package (APK) and receive a quick online analysis containing the file hashes, graphical danger level and additional information.

== Awards and certifications given to AV-Comparatives ==
- 2016: EN ISO 9001:2015 for the Scope "Independent Tests of Anti-Virus Software"
- 2015: EICAR trusted IT-security testing lab
- 2013: Constantinus Award in Computer Science, the highest award/certification given by Austrian Government (Chamber of Commerce) for projects in computer science.
- 2012: Austrian eAward
- 2012: Cluster Award 2012
