= AV-TEST =

Organization which evaluates and rates antivirus and security suite softwares

AV-TEST is an independent organization which evaluates and rates antivirus and security suite software for Microsoft Windows, macOS and Android operating systems, according to a variety of criteria. The organisation is based in Magdeburg, Germany.

Every other month, the researchers publish the results of their testing, where they list which products they awarded their certification. They regularly test antivirus, anti-spyware and firewall software for the software publishers and for magazines. In the field of product certification they work together with Tekit Consult Bonn GmbH (TÜV Saarland group).

AV-TEST is a member of the Anti-Malware Testing Standards Organization.

== History ==
It was founded by Andreas Marx (CEO) and Guido Habicht in 2004. In February 2021, AV Test was acquired by Swiss IT Security.

== Criticism ==
In 2013, the security specialist and CEO of IT security company Kaspersky Lab, Eugene Kaspersky, criticized AV-TEST for changing their certification process.

== See also ==
- AV-Comparatives
