= Kaspersky Lab =

Russian multinational cybersecurity and anti-virus provider

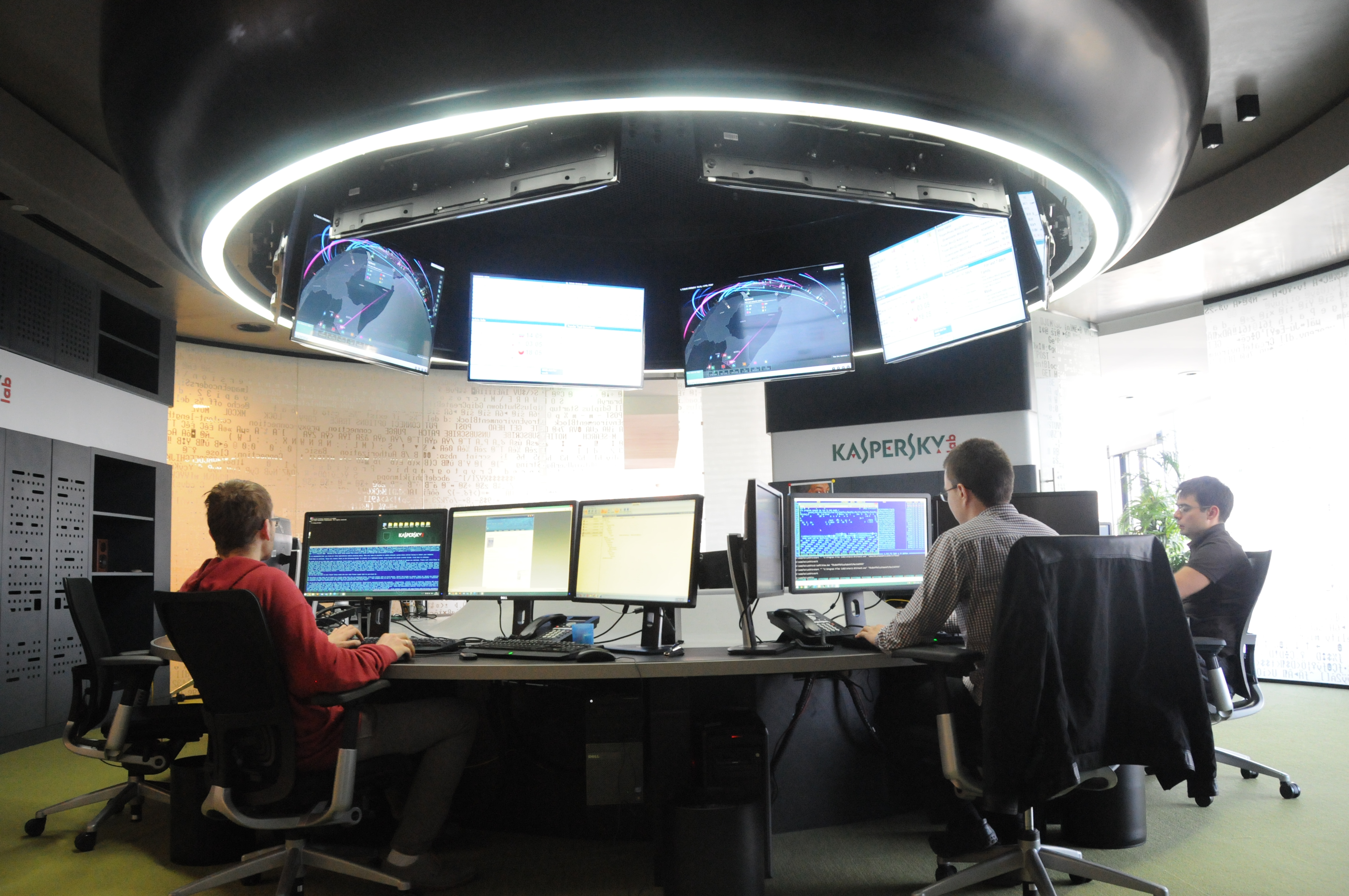
- Kaspersky Virus Lab (September 18, 2014)
- Native name: Лаборатория Касперского
- Romanized name: Laboratoriya Kasperskogo
- Type: Private
- Industry: Computer software
- Founded: Moscow, Russia (1997; 29 years ago)
- Founders: Eugene Kaspersky; Natalya Kaspersky; Alexey De-Monderik; Vadim Bogdanov
- Headquarters: Moscow, Russia; Regional units: Dubai; Istanbul; Mexico City; Midrand; São Paulo; Singapore
- Area served: Worldwide
- Key people: Eugene Kaspersky (CEO)
- Products: Cybersecurity software
- Services: Computer security
- Revenue: ▲US$836 million (2025)
- Number of employees: 5,700 (2025)
- Website: www.kaspersky.com

Kaspersky Lab (/kæˈspɜːrski/; Russian: Лаборатория Касперского, romanized: Laboratoriya Kasperskogo) is a Russian multinational cybersecurity and anti-virus provider company headquartered in Moscow, Russia. It was founded in 1997 by Eugene Kaspersky, Natalya Kaspersky and Alexey De-Monderik. Kaspersky Lab develops and sells antivirus, endpoint security, SIEM, XDR, and other cybersecurity products and services. The Kaspersky Global Research and Analysis Team (GReAT) has led the discovery of sophisticated espionage platforms conducted by nations, such as Equation Group and the Stuxnet worm. Their research has uncovered large-scale and highly technical cyber espionage attempts. Kaspersky also publishes the annual Global IT Security Risks Survey.

Kaspersky expanded abroad from 2005 to 2010 and grew to $822 million in annual revenues by 2024. In 2010, Kaspersky Lab ranked fourth in the global ranking of antivirus vendors by revenue. It was the first Russian company to be included into the rating of the world's leading software companies, called the Software Top 100 (79th on the list, as of June 29, 2012). In 2016, Kaspersky's research hubs analyzed more than 350,000 malware samples per day. In 2016, the software had about 400 million users and was one the largest market-share of cybersecurity software vendors in Europe.

The US government has alleged that Kaspersky has engaged with the Russian Federal Security Service (FSB)—ties which the company has actively denied. In 2017, the Trump administration issued a ban of Kaspersky software on federal civilian and military computers. In response to these and other allegations, Kaspersky began to solicit independent reviews and verification of its source code, and relocated core infrastructure and customer data from Russia to Switzerland. Multiple countries have banned or restricted their government agencies from using Kaspersky products, including Lithuania, the Netherlands, and the United States.

As of 2025, Kaspersky has over 30 offices in Europe, Middle East, Africa, Asia, and Latin America, and customers in over 200 countries.

== History ==
The first version of Kaspersky Lab's antivirus software was developed by Eugene Kaspersky in 1989 in response to the Cascade Virus. Early versions had just 40 virus definitions and were mostly distributed to friends and family members. Kaspersky continued developing the software at KAMI, resulting in the AntiViral Toolkit Pro (AVP) product released in 1992. It was popularized in 1994 after a competitive analysis by Hamburg University gave his software first place.

In 1997, Eugene Kaspersky, his wife Natalya Kaspersky, and Alexey De-Monderik left KAMI to form Kaspersky Lab, (Note: Sources conflict and/or are ambiguous as to the exact number of engineers besides Kaspersky and his wife that cofounded the company.) and to continue developing the antivirus product, then called AVP. The product was renamed Kaspersky Anti-Virus after an American company registered the AVP trademark in the US.

In 1998, a Taiwanese student released a virus called CIH. During the first three weeks of the outbreak, Kaspersky Lab's AVP was the only software at the time able to remove it. This increased demand and led to deals with antivirus companies in Japan, Finland and Germany to integrate AVP into their software.

According to WIRED, Kaspersky's software was "advanced for the time". For example, it was the first software to monitor viruses in an isolated quarantine. The company's revenue grew 280 percent from 1998 to 2000, with about 60 percent of its revenue coming from foreign sales. Natalya worked to broker deals abroad and localize the software. It opened offices in the UK, Poland, Holland and China. It later expanded to Germany, France, the US and Japan. By 2000, the company had 65 employees and sales in more than 40 countries. Kaspersky opened new offices in South East Asia and the Middle East in 2008 and in South Africa in 2009. It also expanded in India, the Middle East and Africa in 2010. In 2009, retail sales of Kaspersky Lab's antivirus products reached almost 4.5 million copies per year.

In 2011, General Atlantic bought a 20 percent share of Kaspersky Lab for $200 million, with the expectation of helping the company go public. A few months later, the decision was made to keep the firm private and Kaspersky re-purchased the shares from General Atlantic. This was followed by numerous executive departures in 2011 and 2014 regarding disputes over going public and over Eugene Kaspersky's management style.

On January 1, 2012, Kaspersky Lab officially left the Business Software Alliance (BSA) over SOPA. The BSA had supported the controversial anti-piracy bill, but Kaspersky Lab did not support it stating, "we believe that such measures will be used contrary to the modern advances in technology and the needs of consumers," and to show their disapproval, announced their intent to leave on December 5, 2011.

By 2013, the company had an unaudited $667 million in annual revenues. In 2014, Kaspersky Lab signed a distribution deal with Ingram Micro, which significantly expanded its reseller program.

In August 2015, two former Kaspersky employees alleged that the company introduced modified files into the VirusTotal antivirus database to trick software from Kaspersky competitors into triggering false positives in virus and malware scans. A possible motive is that Eugene Kaspersky allegedly was furious at competitors perceived to be "unfairly" free-riding on Kaspersky's malware discoveries via the open-source VirusTotal database. The company denied the allegations. On his personal blog, Eugene Kaspersky compared the accusations to unsubstantiated conspiracy theories. Reuters followed up by publishing leaked emails allegedly from Kaspersky alluding to "falsies" and "rubbing out" foreign competitors; Kaspersky Lab stated the emails "may not be legitimate and were obtained from anonymous sources that have a hidden agenda".

In 2016, Kaspersky executive Ruslan Stoyanov was arrested by Russian authorities on charges predating his work at Kaspersky. In 2019, he was convicted of treason.

In 2017, Kaspersky Lab launched the Global Transparency Initiative, which included the opening of transparency centers to demostrate the source code of products to partners and authorities. In 2025, the Transparency Review and Accountability in Cyber Security (TRACS) 2025 study, conducted by the Tyrolean Chamber of Commerce and Industry in collaboration with MCI and AV-Comparatives, covering 14 of the most widely used corporate cybersecurity solutions (Cisco, ESET, Kaspersky, Microsoft, Symantec, etc.), it was noted that only three participants — Cisco, Kaspersky, and Microsoft — applied the practice of transparency centers as a real element of openness policy in the company.

In June 2023, Kaspersky Lab said many of its senior staff and managers were hit by an ongoing attack that it first suspected in early 2023 and has compromised thousands of iPhones. The oldest traces of infection date back to 2019. The Russian Federal Security Service (FSB) separately accused the US National Security Agency and company Apple of being behind the attack and infiltrating the phones of diplomats from China, Israel, NATO members, and Syria. Kaspersky Lab said it does not believe itself to be the main target and that it had not shared its own findings about the attack with Russian authorities until the FSB announcement.

On 20 June 2024, after the US announced that it would prohibit Kaspersky from selling or distributing updates to its software to US customers and sanctioned 12 of its senior leaders, the company announced it would leave the US market. On September 25, the company abruptly replaced its software on US users' computers with UltraAV software developed by US cybersecurity firm Pango, angering some users.

== Products and services ==
Home screen of Kaspersky Internet Security

Kaspersky develops and markets antivirus, internet security, password management, endpoint security, and other cybersecurity products and services. It is among the top five endpoint security vendor and the third largest consumer IT security software company. It is the sixth largest overall IT security company. The software has about 400 million users in all. In 2025, the company's products detected an average of half a million malicious files per day.

Since 2023, Kaspersky's consumer software lineup has consisted of Kaspersky Standard, Plus and Premium, which replaced Kaspersky Anti-Virus, Kaspersky Internet Security and Kaspersky Total Security, respectively. Kaspersky Standard provides antivirus and anti-malware protection, anti-phishing tools, a firewall and performance optimization features. Kaspersky Plus adds privacy protection tools, an unlimited VPN, a password manager and data leak monitoring. Kaspersky Premium further includes identity protection features and expert virus removal.

For businesses, Kaspersky's endpoint solutions include Kaspersky Endpoint Security for Business, Kaspersky Next EDR Optimum and Kaspersky Next XDR Expert. The Kaspersky Endpoint Security for Business suite includes Kaspersky Security Center, a centralized user interface and management application. The suite also includes quarantine, reporting and other management features. Kaspersky Vulnerability Management helps identify, prioritize and remediate vulnerabilities across corporate IT infrastructure. For security operations centers, Kaspersky offers centralized security monitoring with Kaspersky SIEM. The company also provides threat intelligence services for enterprise customers, as well as Kaspersky Managed Detection and Response (MDR), a service for detecting, investigating and responding to cyberthreats.

Kaspersky Small Office Security (KSOS) is a software product aimed at small businesses. Other business products cover container and cloud workload security, virtualization and mobile security. Kaspersky also develops a free tool that helps businesses detect and block ransomware attacks on Windows devices.

For industrial environments, the company has developed Kaspersky Industrial CyberSecurity for OT environments. Its cloud and infrastructure products include Kaspersky Hybrid Cloud Security for cloud workloads and Kaspersky Container Security for containerized environments, while Kaspersky SD-WAN is used for distributed corporate networks.

The KasperskyOS secure operating system was released in 2017 and Kaspersky IoT Secure Gateway 100 for IoT, which runs on it, was introduced in 2021. KasperskyOS has since also been used in thin-client and industrial IoT gateway products.

Kaspersky's software is available for Macs, PCs, Linux, Android, iOS, Windows Mobile, BlackBerry and Symbian.

=== KasperskyOS ===
KasperskyOS is a proprietary microkernel operating system built from scratch using secure-by-design principles. It's developed by Kaspersky for embedded and industrial devices with heightened cybersecurity demands. It features minimal trusted kernel, strict isolation of components in user space, default-deny policy enforcement and formal, policy-based control via the Kaspersky Security System. The aim is to create “Cyber Immune” systems that keep critical functions operating even if some parts of the system are attacked via unknown vulnerabilities. Key use cases are network equipment, industrial control/IoT gateways, smart cars, smart city and transport infrastructure, and other critical-infrastructure uses.

KasperskyOS is distributed both as a platform and inside finished appliances such as the Kaspersky IoT Secure Gateway (KISG 100/1000), while early deployments also appeared in Kraftway routing/switching gear.

There is a community edition for prototyping and development.

=== Threatpost ===
Threatpost is a discontinued computer security blog which was funded by Kaspersky Lab. According to Eugene Kaspersky, it was independent of Kaspersky. It was launched in 2009. After August 2022, no new articles have been published on the site.

== Partnerships ==
The Kaspersky Anti-Virus engine also powers products or solutions by other security vendors, such as Check Point, Bluecoat, Juniper Networks, Microsoft Forefront, Netintelligence, Clearswift, FrontBridge, Netasq, Wedge Networks, and others. Altogether, more than 120 companies are licensing technology from Kaspersky Lab. Kaspersky Lab also has a number of partnerships with various technology companies.

The International Multilateral Partnership Against Cyber Threats in which Datuk Mohd Noor Amin acts as the chairman, announced the appointment of Harry Cheung – Managing Director of Kaspersky Lab, APAC – as the Goodwill Ambassador for Greater China.

Kaspersky Lab was a long-term partner of Scuderia Ferrari and in December 2021, announced a partnership extension with the Formula One team, and also became the team's esports partner. However, in March 2022 the deal was paused as a joint decision taken by the two companies due to the 2022 Russian invasion of Ukraine.

In 2024, Kaspersky and the African Union's law enforcement agency, AFRIPOL, signed a five-year cooperation agreement to prevent and combat cybercrime. In March 2025, the company entered into a strategic partnership with Smart Africa to improve digital literacy among the population and enhance cybersecurity in Africa.

In 2026, the company opened Cybersecurity Centers at children's centers in Dubai and Mumbai to teach children how to interact safely with the digital world.

=== Interpol ===
INTERPOL and Kaspersky have maintained a partnership aimed at preventing and combating cybercrime worldwide. In 2013, Kaspersky supported INTERPOL's Global Complex for Innovation in Singapore by providing digital forensics tools and expertise to aid international investigations.

In 2016, the organizations signed an agreement to share operational information on cyber threats in order to improve real-time data exchange. This cooperation was renewed and expanded in 2019, enabling joint operations targeting major malware campaigns and organized cybercrime groups.

During the 2024 Summer Olympics in Paris, Kaspersky supported INTERPOL in countering cyberattacks aimed at the Games’ infrastructure and participants. In 2025, their joint efforts helped dismantle over 20,000 malicious IP addresses and domains linked to information-stealing malware, as part of a global crackdown involving law enforcement from more than 50 countries.

In 2025–2026, company collaborated with Interpol on the Stadia project to enhance cybersecurity for the Africa Cup of Nations (AFCON) in Morocco.

== Market assessments and reception ==
Kaspersky has passed most of the Virus Bulletin comparative tests since August 2003. In 2005, according to PC World magazine, Kaspersky anti-virus software provided the fastest updates for new virus and security threats in the industry.

In 2007, Kaspersky Internet Security 7 received an award from the British magazine PC Pro and also won a place in its "A List". Its firewall scored 85% and received a "Very Good" rating in Matousec's test. Kaspersky Anti-Virus 7.0 scored 6.5 out of 8 in Anti-Malware Test Lab's rootkit detection test, detected 31 out of 33 polymorphic viruses and achieved a 97% result in a self-protection test.

In February 2008, AV-Comparatives gave Kaspersky Anti-Virus 7.0 for Windows XP its highest "Advanced+" rating, ranking it fourth among 16 products for malware detection. However, in its May retrospective/proactive test, the product received a "Standard" rating, detecting 21% of new malware samples using signatures frozen earlier that February, with two false positives recorded.

In March 2010, PC World ranked Kaspersky Internet Security 2010 second among consumer security suites, awarding it 4.5 out of 5 stars. In 2011, Kaspersky achieved the highest overall ranking in AV-Comparatives' annual assessment and received its "Product of the Year" award.

In February 2012, Kaspersky Internet Security received AV-TEST's "Best Repair 2011" award for home user products. In January 2013, Kaspersky Endpoint Security received AV-TEST's "Best Protection 2012" and "Best Repair 2012" awards for corporate products.

In 2013, Dennis Technology Labs ranked Kaspersky Endpoint Security for Windows first among enterprise antivirus products, ahead of Symantec Endpoint Protection. Kaspersky also received AV-Comparatives' "Product of the Year" award for 2013 and again for 2015. (Note: Bitdefender received the same number of high scores; Kaspersky was chosen arbitrarily between the two as a matter of tie-breaking. The two companies both tend to tie for the top position in competitive tests.)

According to 2016 reviews in PC Magazine, Kaspersky Anti-Virus and competitor Bitdefender consistently ranked among the leading products in independent antivirus tests. The magazine also reported positive results from its own malware and phishing tests, noting Kaspersky Total Security features and additional security tools, although scanning took longer than expected. The product received high scores in lab tests for antivirus, antiphishing and other features and “average” scores in tests for antivirus and spam filtering.

In a separate 2016 review, PC Magazine praised Kaspersky Small Office Security's features but criticized its limited policy management and deployment capabilities.

In its review of Kaspersky Total Security 2017, PC Magazine highlighted its parental control and monitoring, including software content filtering, child profiles, social media monitoring and other features.

Kaspersky products have also received OESIS OK certification for interoperability with third-party network access control and SSL VPN solutions from Cisco, Juniper, F5 and other vendors.

Kaspersky products regularly participate in independent testing conducted by AV-Test, AV-Comparatives, and SE Labs. These organizations are among the independent testing laboratories whose certifications are accepted under the Microsoft Virus Initiative.

Kaspersky products received three awards at the SE Labs Security Awards 2025, covering enterprise, small business and consumer endpoint protection for Windows. In 2026, the company was recognized in the QKS Group’s SPARK Matrix 2025: Digital Threat Intelligence Management report in seven key categories of enterprise cybersecurity products and services.

== Finances ==
Year	Revenue in million US$	Growth / Decrease	Development rate
2012	628	▲	3%
2013	667	▲	6%
2014	711	▲	6,6 %
2015	619	▼	13%
2016	644	▲	4%
2017	698	▲	8%
2018	726	▲	4%
2019	685	▼	6%
2020	703,9	▲	3%
2021	752,3	▲	6,8 %
2022	752,5	▲	0,03 %
2023	721	▼	4,1 %
2024	822	▲	14%
2025	836	▲	4%

== Malware discovery ==
Kaspersky Lab's Global Research and Analysis Team (GReAT) was established in 2008. It investigates cybersecurity threats and other work by malware operations. IT security companies are often evaluated by their ability to uncover previously unknown viruses and vulnerabilities. Kaspersky's reputation for investigating cyber-security threats has been influential in gaining sales and prestige. Beginning around 2010, Kaspersky exposed a series of government-sponsored cyber-espionage and sabotage efforts. These include Stuxnet, Duqu, Flame, Gauss, Regin and the Equation Group. According to Wired, "many of them [were] seemingly launched by the US and its UK and Israeli allies. Kaspersky is especially well-known for its work uncovering Stuxnet, Careto, and Flame."

=== Stuxnet ===
In 2010, Kaspersky Lab worked with Microsoft to counteract the Stuxnet worm, which had infected 14 industrial locations in Iran using four zero-day vulnerabilities in Microsoft Windows. According to IEEE Spectrum, the circumstances "strongly suggest" the worm was developed by the United States and Israel to damage centrifuges in Iran's nuclear-enrichment program. It was the first discovery of a major government-sponsored cyber-attack.

=== Flame ===
In May 2012, Kaspersky Lab identified the malware Flame, which a researcher described as potentially "the most sophisticated cyber weapon yet unleashed". According to the company, the malware had infected an estimated 1,000 to 5,000 machines worldwide when asked by the United Nations International Telecommunication Union to investigate reports of a virus affecting Iranian Oil Ministry computers. As Kaspersky Lab investigated, it discovered an MD5 hash and filename that appeared only on customer machines from Middle Eastern nations. After discovering more pieces, researchers dubbed the program "Flame" after the name of one of its modules.

Flame was an earlier variant of Stuxnet. Kaspersky never verified the source of the software, but it is suspected to have been developed by the National Security Agency (NSA) to transmit keystrokes, Skype calls and other data. Kaspersky created algorithms to find similar malware and found Gauss that July, which collected and transmitted data from devices infected by bluetooth or USB drives.

=== Red October ===
In January 2013, Kaspersky discovered the Red October malware, which had been used for widespread cyber-espionage for five years. It targeted political targets like embassies, nuclear sites, mostly in Europe, Switzerland and North America. The malware was likely written by Russian-speaking hackers and the exploits by Chinese hackers. That June, Kaspersky discovered NetTraveler, which it said was obtaining data on emerging technology from government targets and oil companies. Kaspersky did not identify who was behind it, but it was similar to other cyber-espionage coming from Beijing, China. Later that same year, Kaspersky discovered a hacker group it called Icefog after investigating a cybersecurity attack on a Japanese television company. Kaspersky said the hacker group, possibly from China, was unique in that they targeted specific files they seemed to know about before planting malware to extract them.

=== Mask ===
In February 2014, Kaspersky identified the malware Mask, which infected 380 organizations in 31 countries. Many organizations that were affected were in Morocco. Some of the files were in Spanish and the group is believed to be a state conducting espionage, but Kaspersky did not speculate on which country may have developed it.

=== Regin ===
In November 2014, Symantec and Kaspersky Lab first reported on a malware program called Regin. According to Kaspersky, Regin is similar to QWERTY, a malware program discovered the next year. Regin was used to take remote control of a computer and is believed to have originated from the Five Eyes alliance. That same month Kaspersky reported on the Darkhotel attack, which targeted users of wireless networks at hotels in Asia. It asked users to update their software, and then download malware that gave up their passwords.

=== Duqu ===
In June 2015, Kaspersky announced that state-sponsored malware had infiltrated its own network. This malware was created by the same developers who created Duqu and Stuxnet to find new ways to evade detection. Kaspersky called it Duqu 2.0. The malicious software resided in memory to avoid detection. The hack was believed to have been done by the same group that did Duqu in 2011. It used exploits in Microsoft installer files.

=== Android cyber-espionage ===
In June 2015, Kaspersky Lab and Citizen Lab both independently discovered software developed by Hacking Team and used by 60 governments around the world to covertly record data from the mobile phones of their citizens. The software gave police enforcement a "menu of features" to access emails, text messages, keystrokes, call history and other data. Kaspersky also identified 37,000 attacks against banking companies that used modifications of the malware called Asacub and took control of Android devices. Asacub targeted mostly banking customers in the US, Russia and Ukraine using an SMS message that baited users into installing a Trojan.

=== Silverlight ===
In 2016, Kaspersky discovered a zero day vulnerability in Microsoft Silverlight. Kaspersky identified a string of code often used by exploits created by the suspected author. It then used YARA rules on its network of Kaspersky software users to find that string of code and uncover the rest of the exploit. Afterwards, Microsoft issued a "critical" software patch to protect its software from the vulnerability.

=== Poseidon Group ===
In 2016, Kaspersky uncovered the Poseidon Group, which would infiltrate corporations with malware using phishing emails, then get hired by the same company as a security firm to correct the problem. Once hired, Poseidon would install additional malware and backdoors. In June 2016 Kaspersky helped uncover a Russian hacking group, leading to 50 arrests.

=== Titanium ===
In 2019, Kaspersky uncovered Titanium, a backdoor malware APT, developed by PLATINUM, a cybercrime collective. Kaspersky Lab reported the malware on November 8, 2019.

=== MATA Toolset Campaign ===
In 2020, Kaspersky published research on the MATA Toolset Campaign, a sophisticated cyber-espionage framework targeting multiple operating systems, including Windows, macOS, and Linux. The malware, attributed to the Lazarus Group, was used for stealing databases, distributing ransomware, and installing backdoors on infected systems. MATA's capabilities allowed attackers to execute a wide range of malicious activities, including exfiltrating sensitive data from corporate networks and compromising financial systems. In September 2022 and October 2023, new malware samples linked to the MATA cluster were uncovered.

=== NKAbuse Malware ===
In 2023, Kaspersky exposed NKAbuse, a sophisticated multiplatform malware written in the Go programming language. This malware leveraged blockchain technology for its peer-to-peer communication infrastructure, making it resilient to takedowns. NKAbuse functioned as a flooder and a backdoor, enabling attackers to launch distributed denial-of-service (DDoS) attacks and gain persistent access to compromised systems.

=== Triangulation ===
In 2023, Kaspersky uncovered Triangulation, a sophisticated spyware campaign targeting iOS mobile devices. The malware exploited multiple zero-day vulnerabilities to gain full control of targeted devices. Triangulation was primarily distributed through malicious attachments in instant messaging apps. Once installed, it allowed attackers to access encrypted communications, GPS locations, and sensitive data. Kaspersky attributed this operation to a well-funded APT group with a global reach, but did not specify its location.

=== CloudSorcerer/EastWind ===
CloudSorcerer APT and its EastWind campaign were identified by Kaspersky in 2024.The malware leveraged public cloud infrastructure to perform large-scale data exfiltration and surveillance. The attackers used sophisticated phishing campaigns to infiltrate government and private sector organizations, especially targeting research institutions and critical infrastructure. CloudSorcerer employed novel encryption techniques to disguise data flows, complicating detection. Kaspersky linked the malware to a state-affiliated group but did not specify which country was behind the attack.

=== DuneQuixote ===
In 2024, Kaspersky exposed DuneQuixote, a stealthy malware campaign targeting intellectual property in the technology and energy sectors. The malware used custom-built exploits and employed fileless techniques, operating entirely in memory to evade detection by traditional security tools. DuneQuixote's attack vector included compromised software updates and supply chain vulnerabilities. Kaspersky attributed the operation to a well-funded APT group with global reach, though the precise origin remained unclear. The discovery highlighted the growing complexity of threats targeting high-value intellectual assets.

=== SparkCat ===
In February 2025, Kaspersky discovered SparkCat, a first OCR infostealer found on the iOS App Store. On iOS and Android, SparkCat requests access to users' photo galleries when they attempt to use the support chat in an infected app. Once granted permission, the malware uses OCR technology to decipher text in photos and looks for screenshots of passwords or phrases to gain access to cryptocurrency; it sends the gathered information to the attacker. By February 10, 2025, Apple and Google had removed about 20 apps from their app stores, but the malware persisted in unofficial stores and websites.

=== Equation Group ===
In 2015, Kaspersky identified a highly sophisticated threat actor that it called "The Equation Group". The group incorporated sophisticated spying software into the firmware of hard drives at banks, government agencies, nuclear researchers and military facilities, in countries that are frequent targets of US intelligence efforts. It is suspected to have been developed by the National Security Agency (NSA) and included many unique technical achievements to better avoid detection. That same day, Kaspersky announced the discovery of a hacker group it called Carbanak, which was targeting banks and moving millions of dollars into fake accounts. Carbanak was discovered when one bank asked Kaspersky to investigate suspicious behavior from its ATMs. A similar malware using some of the same techniques as Carbanak was discovered in 2016 and dubbed Carbanak 2.0.

=== ShadowPad ===
In August 2017, Kaspersky Lab uncovered ShadowPad, a backdoor embedded in NetSarang’s server administration products. The malicious code was injected into the nssock2.dll library, signed with a legitimate certificate, and triggered via a DNS TXT record. The breach impacted major corporate networks, including those of financial institutions.

=== ShadowHammer (attack on ASUS) ===
In 2019, Kaspersky Lab uncovered a large-scale supply chain attack in which malicious code was injected into official ASUS Live Update software updates. The backdoor was detected on half a million computers. The attack is estimated to have targeted 600 systems, where attackers actually used the backdoor. The investigation revealed a high level of sophistication in the operation and the use of two different ASUS digital certificates to sign the malware.

Symantec confirmed Kaspersky's findings, reporting that at least 13,000 computers belonging to Symantec customers were infected with the malicious software update. About 18 percent of the infected systems belonging to Kaspersky Lab customers were located in Russia, followed by devices in Germany and France. About 5 percent of infected Kaspersky customers were located in the US, while about 15 percent of Symantec's 13,000 infected systems were located in the US.

=== Free Download Manager ===
In 2023, Kaspersky Lab uncovered a multi-year cyber campaign targeting Linux users. The attackers distributed a compromised Free Download Manager installer through the software's official website. According to Kaspersky's assessment, the operation was active from at least 2020 to 2022. The malicious payload installed a backdoor designed to exfiltrate system data, browser history, credentials, crypto wallets, and cloud infrastructure keys. Affected users were identified globally, notably in Brazil, China, Saudi Arabia, and Russia.

=== PyPI Supply Chain Attack ===
In 2024, Kaspersky uncovered a year-long supply chain attack targeting the Python Package Index (PyPI), a popular repository for Python developers. Attackers uploaded malicious packages containing JarkaStealer, a malware designed to exfiltrate sensitive information from infected systems. These packages were disguised as legitimate tools and lured victims through social engineering tactics, including AI (OpenAI's ChatGPT) chatbots offering assistance.DAEMON Tools

In May 2026, Kaspersky Lab discovered that DAEMON Tools installers—distributed via the official website and signed with legitimate developer certificates—had been compromised. Kaspersky's analysis revealed that versions 12.5.0.2421 through 12.5.0.2434 were trojanized to activate a backdoor upon launch. Although several thousand infection attempts were detected across more than 100 countries, just over 10 devices received the payload, indicating a highly targeted advanced persistent threat (APT).

== Bans and allegations of Russian government ties ==
Since 2015, Western media outlets and governments have accused Kaspersky of having close ties to the Russian government. In 2017, allegations emerged that hackers had used Kaspersky software to steal confidential data from the home computer of a contractor for the US National Security Agency (NSA). Kaspersky denied the allegations, reporting that the software had detected Equation Group malware samples which it uploaded to its servers for analysis in its normal course of operation.

In September 2017, the US Department of Homeland Security banned federal agencies from using and purchasing Kaspersky software, requiring them to remove it from their systems within 90 days. In December, President Donald Trump signed the National Defense Authorization Act for Fiscal Year 2018, which extended this ban to military computers. In response, the company launched a “Global Transparency Initiative”, moving its infrastructure to process customer data to Switzerland and opening transparency centers in a number of countries to allow customers and regulators to review its source code and data processing practices.

In 2022, following Russian invasion of Ukraine, the US warned companies about the risks of using Kaspersky software, and the FCC added it to its list of national security threats. In response, the company said the decision was political and expressed its willingness to cooperate with the authorities to address their concerns. In 2024, leaked emails showed that Kaspersky allegedly helped Russia develop software for spy drones.

In April 2024, it became known that the US Department of Commerce was considering a complete ban on the sale of Kaspersky products. On June 20, Secretary of Commerce Gina Raimondo announced that sales would be banned in the US from July 20 and software updates from September 29, as part of Trump and Biden's executive orders on protecting data from “foreign adversaries.” In July, the company announced the closure of its US office and the dismissal of its staff, and on July 17, it offered US customers six months of free updates, warning of limited functionality after September 29.

In February 2025, Australia banned the use of Kaspersky software in government agencies due to national security concerns. The Department of Home Affairs ordered its removal from government devices by April 1, bringing the country into line with other members of the Five Eyes intelligence pact — the US, Canada, and the UK.

== Security Analyst Summit ==
Security Analyst Summit (SAS) is an annual conference for cybersecurity professionals organized by Kaspersky. The first conference was held in 2009 as a gathering of the company's own researchers and security analysts, and later speakers and guests from other companies were invited. The conference is held annually in different countries, bringing together industry experts, law enforcement representatives, and journalists. The organizer is Kaspersky Lab's Global Research and Analysis Team (GReAT), and the partners are technology companies and industry media outlets.

SAS has regularly featured presentations of important industry research and specialized discussions: research on the Equation Group, Desert Falcons, Carbanak, StripedFly, the TetrisPhantom and Operation Triangulation attacks, the exposure of the Carbanak group, and new spyware from Hacking Team.

=== Conference structure ===
SAS is a symposium dedicated to discussing current threats in the field of cybersecurity, new research, and emerging defensive technologies. It includes expert presentations, panel discussions, practical training sessions, and Capture the Flag (CTF) competitions. Participation in the conference is by invitation only. Most participants are hands-on security professionals (from cyber threat researchers and security software developers to cybersecurity staff at large companies), law enforcement officials from various countries, and representatives of the academic and non-governmental sectors. For example, the 2018 SAS conference in Cancun was attended by about 320 people from more than 30 countries.

The reports and technical studies cover advanced cyber threats, APT group activities, targeted attacks, critical infrastructure and industrial systems (ICS/OT) security, attacks on the Internet of Things (IoT) and their prevention, threats to supply chains and open source software security, incidents involving ransomware and defensive measures, zero-day vulnerabilities and exploits, darknet analysis, and the role of artificial intelligence and machine learning in cybersecurity. SAS 2025 featured presentations on automotive cybersecurity, the use of dashcams in cyberattacks, vulnerabilities in the automotive industry, and research on targeted campaigns.

SAS traditionally hosts the finals of the Capture the Flag (CTF) international competition for cybersecurity experts. Participants compete in solving applied problems related to vulnerability detection, cryptography, malware analysis, and other aspects of information security. The qualifying round is held online (for example, in Jeopardy format, where participants solve problems from different areas of cybersecurity and receive “flags” for correct answers), and the final round is held directly at SAS with a prize pool (in 2025, $18,000).

=== Key reports and research on SAS ===
A significant part of the SAS program over the years has been devoted to presenting the results of new investigations into cyberattacks and APT groups.

- Careto (“The Mask”) – In 2014, Kaspersky reported on the Careto campaign (also known as The Mask), which targeted Spanish-speaking countries. Kaspersky first publicly presented information about Careto at the SAS conference in Punta Cana. The attack reportedly lasted for many years and affected government and energy structures in more than 30 countries. Researchers noted that Careto was one of the most sophisticated cyber espionage operations.
- Equation Group – In 2015, the GReAT team presented an analysis of the attacks and malware used by the Equation Group, one of the most advanced APTs. Equation used malware at the hard drive firmware level and attacked hundreds of computers in dozens of countries. The report on Equation caused significant attention in the professional community and the media.
- Carbanak – In 2015, Kaspersky researchers, in collaboration with law enforcement agencies, uncovered the Carbanak cybercriminal group, which defrauded about 100 banks around the world. Information about the attacks was presented at SAS in Cancun in 2015, including details of theft operations totaling up to $1 billion. It was proven that the attackers infected corporate bank networks and made unauthorized money transfers.
- De-anonymization of hackers – In 2015, research was presented at SAS on the de-anonymization of cybercriminals through analysis of their online behavior. Recorded Future showed how attackers, even those using Tor, left so many traces on the internet that they could be linked to real people. In particular, by analyzing common data leaks from attackers, Recorded Future showed that information about former hackers, including email addresses and passwords, was easily found in open sources.
- Moonlight Maze – The historic Moonlight Maze operation (late 1990s) was again the subject of analysis at SAS in 2016. A new investigation presented by Professor Thomas Reed linked the well-known Moonlight Maze operation to modern attacks by the Turla group. Moonlight Maze was one of the first identified cyber campaigns, likely sponsored at the state level (it attacked the Pentagon, NASA, and U.S. energy facilities), and its study served as the basis for understanding modern threats.
- Attack via CCleaner – In 2018, the Avast team presented a report at SAS on the results of its investigation into the compromise of the CCleaner utility. Experts discovered the ShadowPad backdoor in the CCleaner developers' infrastructure and presented details in a report at SAS in Cancun. The attack affected millions of users, and the report revealed technical details of the campaign, including links to the Axiom group (presumably associated with APT17).
- Data leaks via multi-scanning services – Representatives of Swisscom AG spoke about security threats arising from the fact that confidential data (personal, government, official, commercial) ends up in malware scanning services. Such services have effectively become repositories of sensitive business data, creating a new class of risks for corporate security.
- Vulnerabilities in robotics – Research by the MalCrawler team at SAS 2018 demonstrated security issues in industrial robotic systems: many industrial robots use outdated operating systems (e.g., Windows XP) and control systems that are accessible by default without a password, and robot control programs remain “open” to hacking. As a result, industrial facilities are vulnerable to “emergency shutdown” attacks (e.g., Triconex/Triton).
- ShadowHammer – In 2019, Kaspersky Lab uncovered the ShadowHammer supply chain attack: malicious code was embedded in official ASUS Live Update updates and delivered to 500,000–1,000,000 computers, with the attack specifically targeting approximately 600 systems. Analysis showed a high level of preparation for the operation using compromised ASUS digital certificates. Kaspersky's findings were also confirmed by Symantec.
- Operation Triangulation – A sophisticated spy attack on iOS devices using multiple zero-day vulnerabilities. Known cases of compromise cover the period from 2019 to 2024. Triangulation software allowed spies to gain complete control over victims' iPhones without interacting with the user. A description of this scheme and the hardware vulnerabilities used appeared in reports by Kaspersky and a review by Dark Reading. Journalists noted that Triangulation bypassed most of the iPhone's security mechanisms by relying on undocumented OS and hardware features. The research was presented at SAS in Thailand in 2023.
- Malware disguised as crypto games – In 2024, Kaspersky GReAT experts uncovered a sophisticated campaign by the Lazarus group, in which malware was distributed under the guise of a crypto game. According to the study, the attackers exploited users' interest in crypto assets and gaming projects to infect systems and subsequently conduct surveillance. Analysts noted the high level of concealment and the multi-stage nature of the attack.
- New spyware from Hacking Team – In 2025, researchers recorded the use of Dante spyware tools linked to the Italian company Memento Labs, which emerged during the reorganization of Hacking Team. The campaign exploited a zero-day vulnerability in Chrome.

=== Notable participants and speakers ===
- Charlie Miller & Chris Valasek – Renowned automotive security researchers. They spoke at the Kaspersky Security Analyst Summit in 2016. Their presentation focused on vulnerabilities in the Jeep Cherokee's Uconnect system that allowed researchers to remotely hack into the vehicle.
- Katie Moussouris – American computer security researcher, creator of Microsoft's bug bounty program, founder of Luta Security. She spoke at SAS about the right ways to build the bug bounty program.
- Bruce Schneier – Internationally recognized cryptography, cybersecurity and public policy expert. He gave a keynote speech at SAS and participated in a discussion with Baroness Pauline Neville-Jones, former Minister of State for Security of the United Kingdom, on civil liberties and government cyber intelligence.
- Eva Galperin – Eva Galperin, Director of Cybersecurity at the Electronic Frontier Foundation (EFF), spoke at the Kaspersky Security Analyst Summit (SAS) in 2018. Her presentation focused on research into a suspected state-sponsored Lebanese hacking group known as Dark Caracal.
- Matt Tait – A researcher in the field of cyber threats and malware analysis, former GCHQ employee, and Google hacker. In 2018, he gave a keynote speech on the topic of disinformation in the general cyber threat landscape.

== See also ==
- Antivirus software
- Titanium (malware)
- Shaltai Boltai
- Vault 7
