= International Multilateral Partnership Against Cyber Threats =

United Nations-backed cybersecurity alliance

Coordinates: 2.9193135°N 101.6610781°E

International Multilateral Partnership Against Cyber Threats (IMPACT)
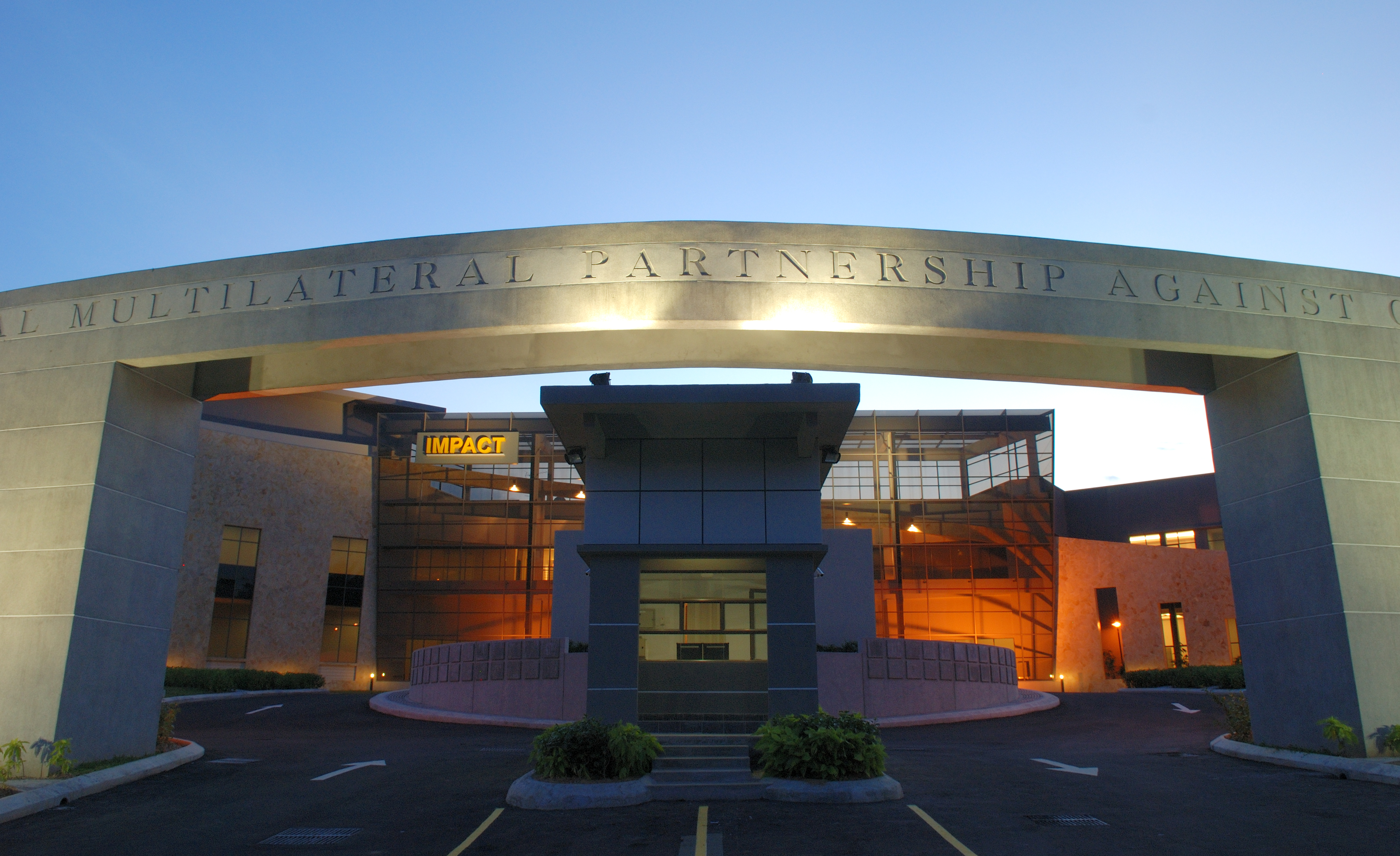
- IMPACT Global Headquarters
- Founded: 2008
- Type: United Nations-affiliated International Organisation
- Purpose: Cybersecurity, Governments, United Nations’ member states, industry, academia
- Location: Cyberjaya, Malaysia
- Key people: Datuk Mohd Noor Amin, Chairman of the IMPACT Management Board
- Website: impact-alliance.org

The International Multilateral Partnership Against Cyber Threats (IMPACT) is the first United Nations-backed cybersecurity alliance. Since 2011, IMPACT serves as a key partner of the United Nations (UN) specialized agency for ICTs – the International Telecommunication Union (ITU).

IMPACT serves as a platform that brings together governments of the world (152 countries), industry, and academia to enhance the global community's capabilities in dealing with cyber threats, becoming the largest cybersecurity alliance of its kind.

Headquartered in Cyberjaya, Malaysia, IMPACT is the operational home of ITU's Global Cybersecurity Agenda (GCA). IMPACT offers ITU's Member States access to expertise, facilities, and resources to effectively address cyber threats, as well as assist United Nations agencies in protecting their ICT infrastructures.

The IMPACT initiative was first announced by the fifth prime minister of Malaysia during the closing ceremony of the 15th World Congress on Information Technology (WCIT) 2006, held in the Austin, Texas, United States.

Initially, IMPACT was known as the 'International Multilateral Partnership Against Cyber-Terrorism'. In 2008, following feedback from member governments and also from IMPACT's international advisory board (IAB) during IMPACT's official launch at the World Cyber Security Summit 2008 (WCSS), the words 'Cyber Terrorism' in IMPACT's name was changed to 'Cyber Threats' to reflect its wider cybersecurity role.

== Facilities at the Global Headquarters ==
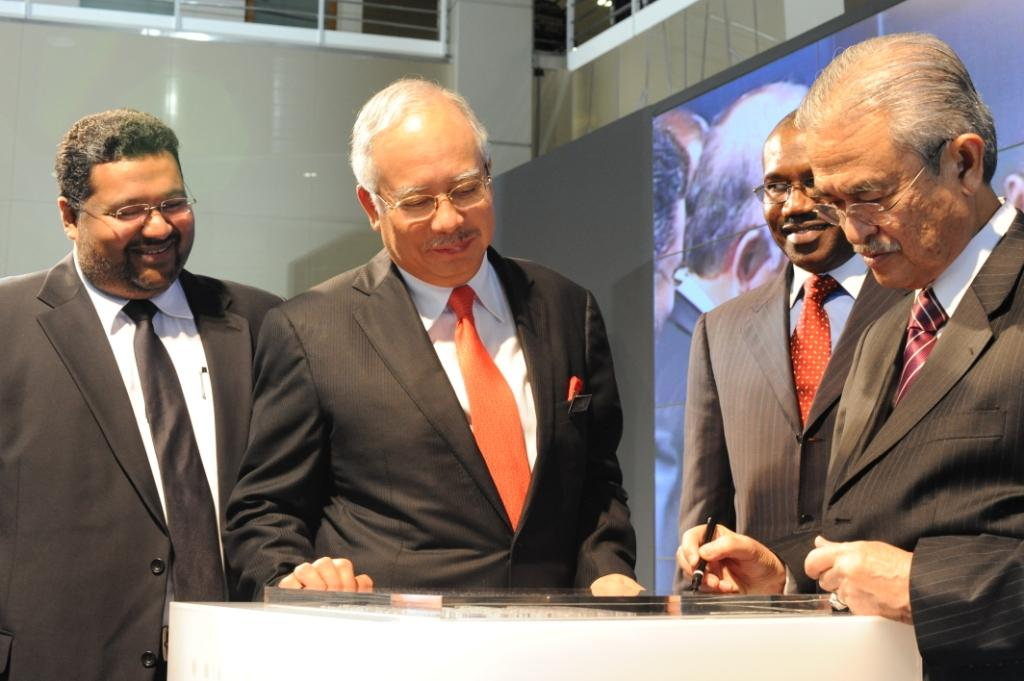
The Launch, IMPACT Global Headquarters

IMPACT's Global Headquarters was inaugurated on 20 May 2009. It was built on a 28,400 square meter site (seven-acre site) with a built-up area of over 5,400 square meters (58,000 square feet). Modeled after the Centers for Disease Control and Prevention (CDC) in Atlanta, United States, IMPACT operates a Global Response Centre (GRC). As the nerve center of IMPACT, the GRC is fully equipped with a crisis room, IT and communications facilities, a fully functional Security Operations Centre (SOC), a well-equipped data center, an on-site broadcasting center and a VIP viewing gallery. The GRC is involved in securing the objectives of ITU's Global Cybersecurity Agenda (GCA) by placing the technical measures to combat newly evolved cyber threats.

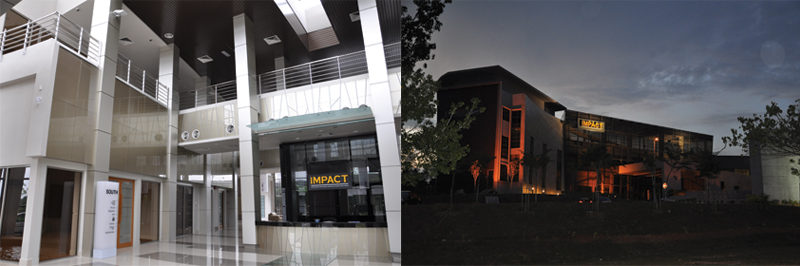
IMPACT-Building, Interior and Exterior

The IMPACT Global Headquarters was officially declared open on 20 May 2009 by the 5th Prime Minister of Malaysia, Tun Abdullah bin Ahmad Badawi, witnessed by the Prime Minister of Malaysia, Dato' Sri Mohd Najib bin Tun Abdul Razak and the secretary-general of the ITU, Hamadoun Touré and IMPACT's chairman, Datuk Mohd Noor Amin

Through the GRC, IMPACT provides the global community with a network early warnings system (NEWS), expert locator, team management, remediation, automated threat analysis system, trend libraries, visualization of global threats, country-specific threats, incident and case management, trend monitoring and analysis, knowledge base, reporting, and resolution finder among others.

== Collaboration with the ITU ==
IMPACT formally became a key partner of ITU – the United Nations (UN) specialized agency, following a Cooperation Agreement signed during the World Summit for Information Society 2011 (WSIS) Forum in Geneva, in May 2011.

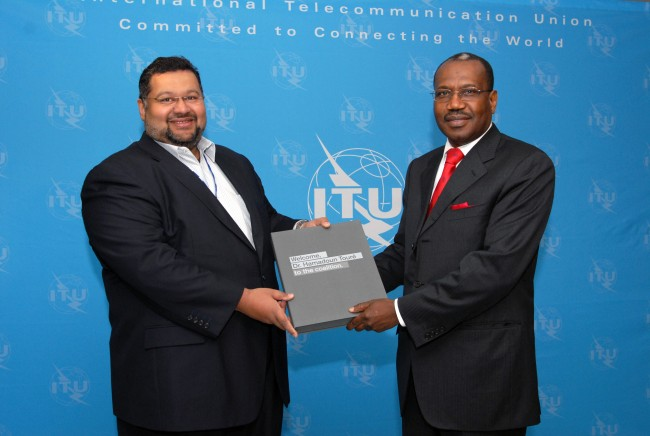
IMPACT formally became the cybersecurity executing arm of ITU - the United Nations (UN) specialised agency

Under the Cooperation Agreement, IMPACT is tasked by ITU with the responsibility of providing cybersecurity assistance and support to ITU's 193 Member States and also to other organizations within the UN system. The Memorandum of Agreement was officially signed by Hamadoun Touré, the secretary-general of ITU, and Datuk Mohd Noor Amin, chairman of IMPACT at the ITU's head office in Geneva. Founded in 1865, ITU is the oldest organization within the UN system and functions as the UN's specialized agency for information and communication technologies.

IMPACT's involvement with ITU began in 2008 when it was named the physical home of ITU's Global Cybersecurity Agenda (GCA). The GCA is an international cybersecurity framework that was formulated following deliberations by more than 100 leading experts worldwide. The GCA contains many recommendations, which when adopted and implemented, are intended to provide improved global cybersecurity. Through a Memorandum of Understanding inked in Bangkok back in 2008, IMPACT was named the physical and operational home of the GCA.

In addition to this, during the 2011 WSIS Forum, a Memorandum of Understanding (MoU) was signed between ITU and the United Nations Office on Drugs and Crime (UNODC) which will see IMPACT supporting both organizations in their collaboration to assist UN member states to mitigate risks posed by cybercrime.

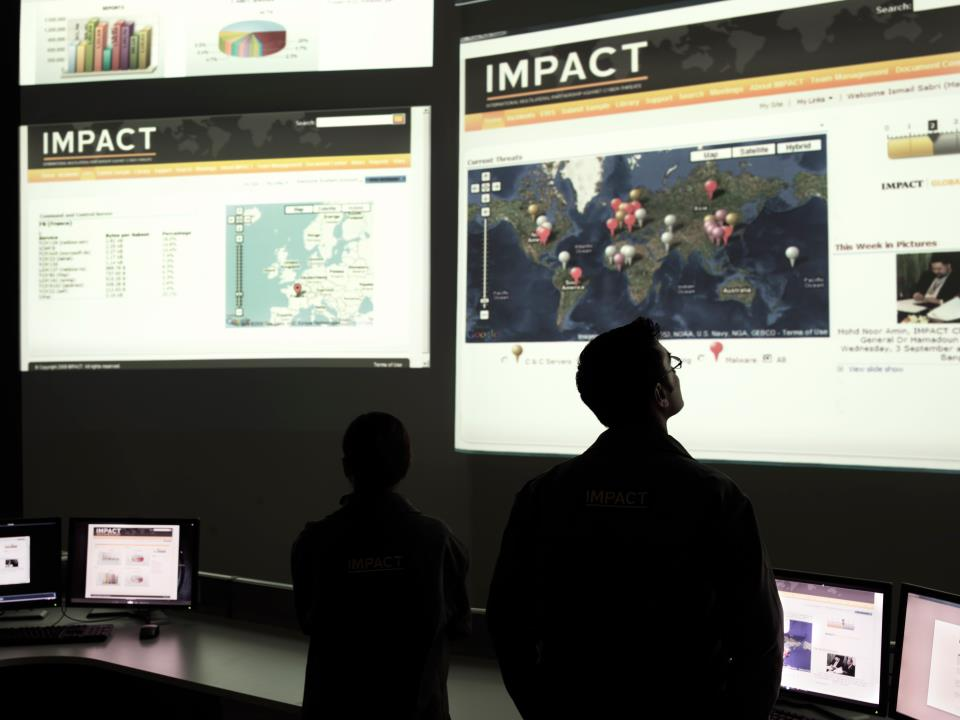
Global Response Centre (GRC)

Partner countries of ITU-IMPACT are also given access to a host of specialized services including monitoring, analysis, and alerts on cyber threats.

IMPACT's Global Response Centre (GRC) acts as a global cyber threat resource center and provides emergency responses to facilitate the identification of cyber threats and sharing of resources to assist ITU-UNODC Member States. IMPACT's Global Response Centre (GRC) collaborates with industry and academia and hosts a comprehensive database on cyber threats. IMPACT's Electronically Secure Collaborative Application Platform for Experts (ESCAPE), is designed to connect those responsible for cybersecurity from over 140 countries. It also provides a response mechanism for ITU-IMPACT partner countries.

The other three divisions within IMPACT are the Centre for Policy & International Cooperation, the Centre for Training & Skills Development, and the Centre for Security Assurance & Research. These divisions provide consulting and training services, scholarships, reports, and expertise to governments, industry, and academia in partner countries.

== International Advisory Board ==
As of 2013 International Advisory Board (IAB) members included:

- Chairman: Blaise Compaoré, president of Burkina Faso. Prior to the appointment of the president of Burkina Faso, the prime minister of Malaysia held the position of chairman of the IAB from its establishment (in 2008) to 2011.
- Hamadoun Touré, Secretary-General of the ITU
- Steve Chang, Founder & Chairman of Trend Micro
- Eugene Kaspersky, founder and chief executive officer of Kaspersky Lab
- Fred Piper, Cryptologist, founder of the Information Security Group at Royal Holloway, University of London
- Gilbert G. Noël Ouedraogo, Minister of Transport & Information Technology, Burkina Faso
- Samuel Lesuron Poghisio, MP, Minister of Information and Communications, Kenya
- M. Ali Abbasov, Minister of Communications & Information Technologies, Azerbaijan
- Vujica Lazović, Minister of Information Society and Telecommunications, Montenegro
- Salim Sultan Al Ruzaiqi, chief executive officer, Information Technology Authority (ITA), Oman
- Tim Unwin, chief executive officer, Commonwealth Telecommunications Organisation
- Tim Archdeacon, president and chief executive officer, ABI Research
- Abdou Diouf, secretary-general, International Organisation of La Francophonie (OIF)
- Angela Sinaswee-Gervais, permanent secretary, Trinidad & Tobago

Past members include Vinton G. Cerf, vice president and chief Internet evangelist, Google, Howard Schmidt, the former White House Cyber Security Coordinator of the Obama and Bush Administrations, United States of America, Mikko Hyppönen, chief research officer of F-Secure, John W. Thompson, former chairman of the board, Symantec Corporation and Ayman Hariri, chairman of Oger Systems.

Under the advisory board, the management team consists of Mohd Noor Amin, chairman, management board, Mohamed Shihab, advisor (technical), Mohamed Zaini Bin Mazlan, advisor (administration), Anuj Singh, chief operating officer (COO), Phillip Victor, director of policy and international cooperation, and Mohamad Sazly Musa, director of security assurance.

== Support ==
- The Malaysian Government provided a US$13M grant with a view to establishing IMPACT's central headquarters equipped with the best facilities for the international community.
- F-Secure has contributed its expertise in establishing IMPACT's Global Response Centre – designed as the first line of defence against cyber threats.
- Kaspersky Lab provided technical expertise in setting up IMPACT's Network Early Warning System (NEWS) in the Global Response Centre.
- SANS Institute and EC-Council have contributed a grant of US$1m each to IMPACT to create scholarship schemes for developing nations that will help enhance and build capacity and capability in cybersecurity.
- Symantec Corporation assisted IMPACT in establishing the "IMPACT Government Security Scorecard".

== See also ==
- International Telecommunication Union
- United Nations Information and Communication Technologies Task Force
