= Turla =

Turla may refer to:

- Dniester (Turkish: Turla), a river
- Turla (malware), a Russian spyware package
- Vladas Turla (born 1953), Lithuanian sports shooter
