= Snake (malware) =

Russian malware

Malware details
- Classification: Spyware
- Origin: Russia
- Author: Federal Security Service

Snake was malware developed by the Federal Security Service of Russia. It was one of the most used tools by FSB's Center 16 and formed a part of the Turla toolset. The malware was reportedly deployed in at least 50 countries, targeting government systems, diplomatic communications, and research institutions to gather data.

== History ==
Its development began in 2003 as “Uroburos”. By early 2004, development was finished and cyber operations using the malware had started. On 8 May 2023, under Operation MEDUSA, the FBI and other agencies took down Snake's infrastructure.
