= Hamadoun Touré =

Malian engineer and ITU Secretary-General

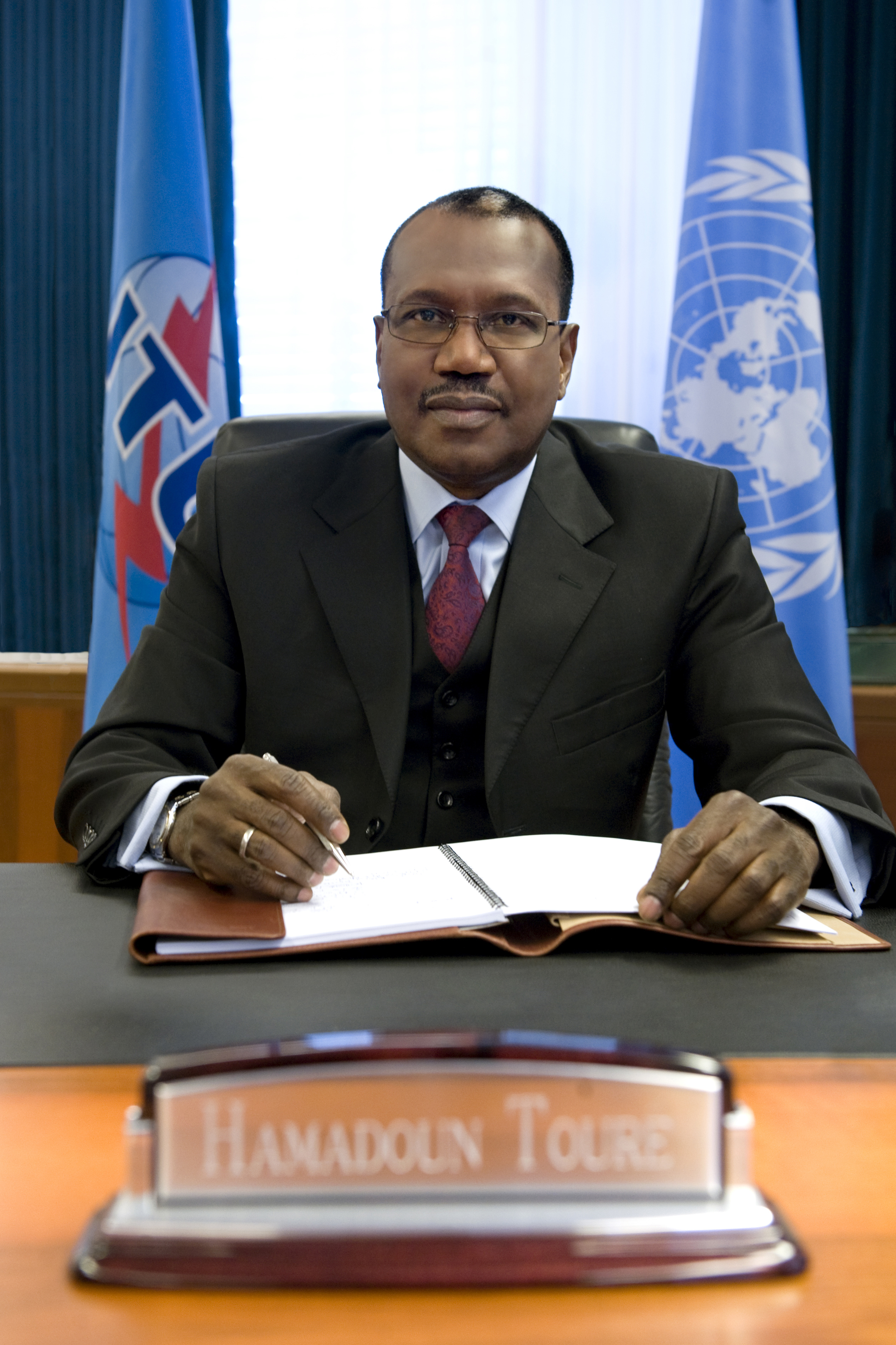

Secretary-General of the ITU
- In office 1 January 2007 – 31 December 2014
- Preceded by: Yoshio Utsumi
- Succeeded by: Houlin Zhao

Personal details
- Education: Technical Institute of Electronics and Telecommunications of Leningrad, Soviet Union; University of Electronics, Telecommunications and Informatics of Moscow, Soviet Union

Hamadoun Ibrahim Touré (born September 3, 1953) is a Malian electrical engineer that served as Secretary General of the International Telecommunication Union (ITU) from 2007 to December 2014. He was re-elected for a second four-year term in 2010. Since 2007, he has worked to fulfil ITU's mandate to 'connect the world' and help achieve the Millennium Development Goals.

He has also actively promoted the ITU Connect series of events, with the first one, Connect Africa, being held in Niger and Somalia, in 1997. Connect Africa raised US$55 million in investment pledges to improve Africa's telecommunication infrastructure over seven years. In the first two years, 1998 and 1999, US$22 million was invested in ICT infrastructure, mainly for mobile communications. He has also served on the International Multilateral Partnership Against Cyber Threats (IMPACT) International Advisory Board.

In May 2011, Touré was appointed the United Nations' (UN) Cybersecurity Executing Arm by the UN's Specialised Agency – International Telecommunication Union (ITU). The Memorandum of Agreement was officially signed by Touré and Datuk Mohd Noor Amin, Chairman of IMPACT at the TCU's head office in Geneva.

== Biography ==
Hamadoun Touré holds a master's degree in Electrical Engineering from the Technical Institute of Electronics and Telecommunications of Leningrad as well as a doctorate from the University of Electronics, Telecommunications and Informatics of Moscow. He began his career in 1979 at the Office des Postes et Télécommunications du Mali. He had a distinguished career in the satellite industry, working with Intelsat from 1985 to 1996 and managing its rapid expansion in Africa and the Middle East regional through connectivity projects such as RASCOM.

Touré was elected as the Director of the ITU's Telecommunications Development Bureau at the 1998 Plenipotentiary Conference in Minneapolis, and re-elected at the Marrakesh conference in 2002. He was elected as the ITU Secretary-General at the 2006 Plenipotentiary Conference in Antalya, and re-elected for a second four-year term in 2010 at the Guadalajara conference.

In 2015, following his retirement from ITU, Touré returned to Mali where he was appointed as Founding Executive Director of the SMART Africa Alliance.

He is married with four children and two grandchildren, and is proficient in four official ITU languages: English, French, Russian and Spanish.
