= FSB Academy =

Russian school of intelligence tradecraft

Academy of the Federal Security Service of the Russian Federation named after F. E. Dzerzhinsky
- Академия Федеральной службы безопасности России имени Ф. Э. Дзержинского
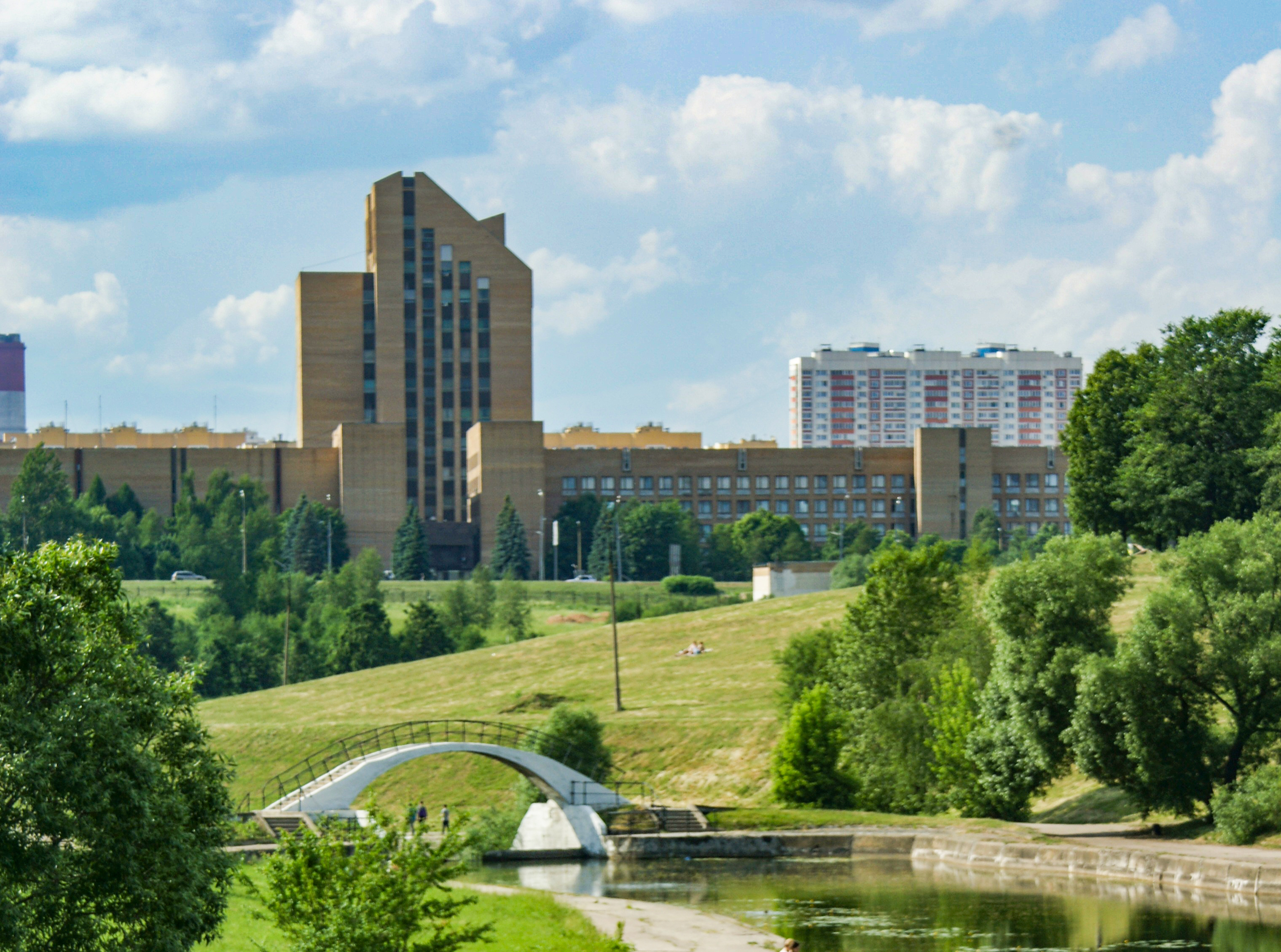
- The FSB Academy in 2014.
- Former name: Higher School of the KGB (until 1995)
- Established: April 26, 1921; August 24, 1992 (current form)
- Location: 70 Michurinsky Prospekt, Moscow, Russia; 55°41′00″N 37°28′13″E
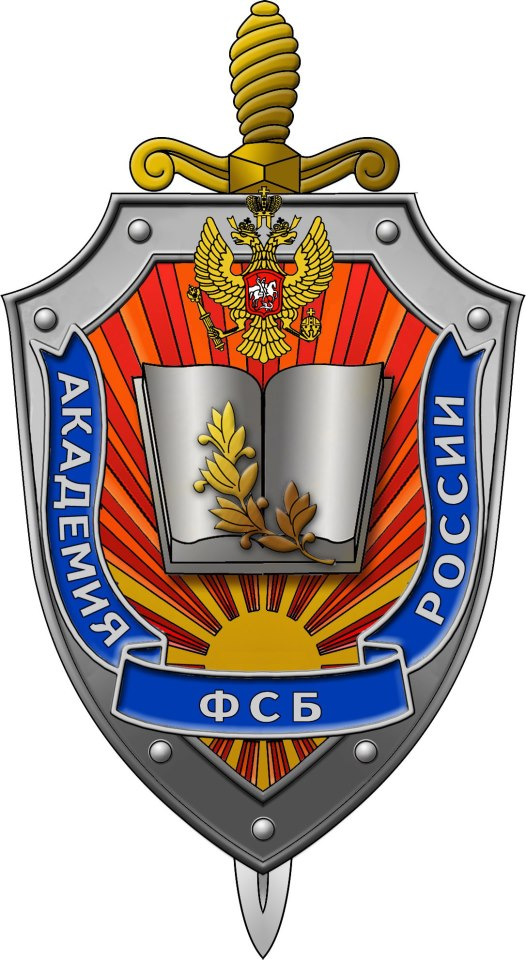

The FSB Academy (Russian: Академия ФСБ), in full the Academy of the Federal Security Service of the Russian Federation named after F. E. Dzerzhinsky (Note: Russian: Академия Федеральной службы безопасности России имени Ф. Э. Дзержинского) is a Russian government school which teaches tradecraft to intelligence officers of the Russian Federal Security Service (FSB), the greater Russian Intelligence Community, and Russian allies, including many of the Commonwealth of Independent States (CIS) countries. It has existed in various names and forms since 1921, when it was established by the Cheka to educate Soviet secret police. Following the collapse of the Soviet Union, the FSB Academy was chartered August 24, 1992, to absorb the Higher School of the KGB and the Academy of Border Troops.

The academy is located at the 1980 Olympic Village in Moscow's Ramenki District. The school includes several departments, among them the Institute of Cryptography, Telecommunications and Computer Science (Note: Russian: Институт криптографии, связи и информатики, ИКСИ) and the Institute for Operational Training. (Note: Russian: Институт подготовки оперативного состава, ИПОС)

Since 2022, the academy's director has been Colonel General Nikolai Plotnikov.

== History ==
=== Background ===
The academy has existed through many iterations amid the periodic purges and reformations of the Soviet and Russian intelligence services.

Its origins trace to the Presidium of Soviet Russia's first security service, the Cheka (VChK), who established a special institute for operational training in April 1921. When the Cheka was reorganized into the State Political Directorate (GPU) a year later in 1922, the institute was renamed the Higher Courses of the State Political Directorate. The following year in 1923 the GPU was replaced by the Joint State Political Directorate (OGPU). In May 1930 Moscow created higher schools for basic and advanced training of secret agents; on June 4, 1930 the school was known as the Central School of OGPU. July 14, 1934, after the formation of the People's Commissariat of Internal Affairs, the former OGPU Central School was renamed the Central School of General Directorate for State Security (GUGB) of the NKVD. On March 21, 1939 the Central School of GUGB NKVD was reorganized as the Graduate School of the NKVD. By the early 1940s, every third head of the Soviet security organs was a graduate of the course. During the Great Patriotic War, the school trained more than seven thousand security officers who organized the fight against Nazi Germany.

By Resolution of the Council of Ministers on August 2, 1962 the KGB Higher School was named after Felix Dzerzhinsky. During the 1960s to 1980s, graduates took part in countering foreign intelligence services and conducting operational and combat activities.

After the collapse of the Soviet Union, Russian president Boris Yeltsin established the academy by decree on August 24, 1992 to absorb the former Higher School of the KGB.

In 1995, the Higher School of the KGB was renamed the FSB Academy. In April 2026, Russian president Vladimir Putin signed a decree to restore Felix Dzerzhinsky's name to the academy.

Prior names of the FSB Academy
Service	Name	Start Date	End Date
Cheka	Special Institute for Operational Training of the Cheka	April 1921	1922
GPU	Higher Courses of the State Political Directorate	1922	June 4, 1930
OGPU	Central School of the Joint State Political Directorate	June 4, 1930	July 14, 1934
GUGB	Central School of Main Directorate of State Security	July 14, 1934	March 21, 1939
NKVD	Graduate School of the People's Commissariat for Internal Affairs	March 21, 1939	c. 1954
KGB	Higher School of the Committee for State Security	c. 1954	August 2, 1962
KGB	Higher School of the Committee for State Security named for F.E. Dzerzhinzky	August 2, 1962	August 24, 1992
MBRF	Academy of the Ministry of Security of the Russian Federation	August 24, 1992	December 21, 1993
FSK	Academy of the Ministry of Security of the Russian Federation	December 21, 1993	June 23, 1995
FSB	Academy of the Federal Security Service	June 23, 1995	April 21, 2026
FSB	Academy of the Federal Security Service named for F.E. Dzerzhinzky	April 21, 2026	present

== Directors of the FSB Academy ==
Colonel General Viktor Ostroukhov was Head of the Academy from 2007 until 2019. It was then directed by Colonel General Yevgeny Sysoyev and since 2022 it has been directed by Colonel General Nikolay Vladimirovich Plotnikov.

== See also ==
- Institute of Cryptography, Telecommunications and Computer Science
- Moscow Border Institute of the FSB of the Russian Federation
