= Institute of Cryptography, Telecommunications and Computer Science =

Russian research institute

- Other name: IKSI
- Established: 1949

The Institute of Cryptography, Telecommunications and Computer Science (Russian: Институт криптографии, связи и информатики) or IKSI (ИКСИ) is a research institute within the Academy of the Federal Security Service of Russia, which trains specialists in areas such as the transfer, protection and processing of information. The key specialist training areas are cryptography, applied mathematics, information technology and digital technology, electrical engineering, radio technology and communications.

Prior to the dissolution of the Soviet Union, the Institute was known as The Technical Faculty of the KGB Higher School.

== History ==
The institute began its history in 1949 when a resolution by the Politburo created the Higher School of Cryptographers, and a closed department was created under the Mechanics-Mathematics Faculty of Moscow State University by a resolution of the Council of Ministers of the USSR. Later they united to become the technical faculty of the Dzerzhinsky Higher School of the KGB.

The institute comprises faculties of applied mathematics, specialised engineering and information security, departments of natural science, special skills, and English language. The institute also runs an evening physics and maths school, an ex-budgetary Scientific Research Laboratory while the Academy has provision for post-graduate military courses, MA and PhD dissertation boards.

== Specialties ==
- Department of Applied Mathematics
- Cryptography
- Applied Mathematics and Computer Science Automation of information and analytical processes
- Faculty of Special Technology Information, security telecommunications systems and electronic systems
- Faculty of Information Security

== Notable alumni ==
- Eugene Kaspersky – cybersecurity expert

== See also ==
- FBI Academy
- National Intelligence University
- Mercyhurst University Institute for Intelligence Studies
