= Carbanak =

Cyberattack on banking industry

Carbanak is an APT-style campaign targeting (but not limited to) financial institutions, that was discovered in 2014 by the Russian cyber security company Kaspersky Lab. It utilizes malware that is introduced into systems running Microsoft Windows using phishing emails, which is then used to steal money from banks via macros in documents. The hacker group is said to have stolen over 900 million dollars from the banks as well as money from over a thousand private customers.

The criminals were able to manipulate their access to the respective banking networks in order to steal the money in a variety of ways. In some instances, ATMs were instructed to dispense cash without having to locally interact with the terminal. Money mules, which were hired through the Moldavian mafia, would collect the money and transfer it over the SWIFT network to the criminals’ accounts, Kaspersky said. The Carbanak group went so far as to alter databases and pump up balances on existing accounts and pocketing the difference unbeknownst to the user whose original balance is still intact.

Their intended targets were primarily in Russia, followed by the United States, Germany, China and Ukraine, according to Kaspersky Lab. One bank lost $7.3 million when its ATMs were programmed to spew cash at certain times that henchmen would then collect, while a separate firm had $10 million taken via its online platform.

Kaspersky Lab is helping to assist in investigations and countermeasures that disrupt malware operations and cybercriminal activity. During the investigations they provide technical expertise such as analyzing infection vectors, malicious programs, supported command and control infrastructure and exploitation methods.

FireEye published research tracking further activities, referring to the group as FIN7, including an SEC-themed spear phishing campaign. Proofpoint also published research linking the group to the Bateleur backdoor, and expanded the list of targets to U.S.-based chain restaurants, hospitality organizations, retailers, merchant services, suppliers and others beyond their initial financial services focus.

On 26 October 2020, PRODAFT (Switzerland) started publishing internal details of the Fin7/Carbanak group and tools they use during their operation. Published information is claimed to be originated from a single OPSEC failure on the threat actor's side.

On March 26, 2018, Europol claimed to have arrested the "mastermind" of the Carbanak and associated Cobalt or Cobalt Strike group in Alicante, Spain, in an investigation led by the Spanish National Police with the cooperation of law enforcement in multiple countries as well as private cybersecurity companies. The group's campaigns appear to have continued, however, with the Hudson's Bay Company breach using point of sale malware in 2018 being attributed to the group.

In the U.S., Ukrainian national Fedir Hladyr, one of the leaders of FIN7, was sentenced to 10 years in prison in April 2021. Andrii Kolpakov, a fellow Ukrainian who had pleaded guilty in November 2020, was sentenced to seven years in prison and ordered to pay $2.5 million in restitution.

== Controversy ==
Some controversy exists around the Carbanak attacks, as they were seemingly described several months earlier in a report by the Internet security companies Group-IB (Singapore) and Fox-IT (The Netherlands) that dubbed the attack Anunak. The Anunak report shows also a greatly reduced amount of financial losses and according to a statement issued by Fox-IT after the release of The New York Times article, the compromise of banks outside Russia did not match their research. Also in an interview conducted by Russian newspaper Kommersant the controversy between the claims of Kaspersky Lab and Group-IB come to light where Group-IB claims no banks outside of Russia and Ukraine were hit, and the activity outside of that region was focused on Point of Sale systems.

Reuters issued a statement referencing a Private Industry Notification issued by the FBI and USSS (United States Secret Service) claiming they have not received any reports that Carbanak has affected the financial sector. Two representative groups of the US banking industry FS-ISAC and ABA (American Bankers Association) in an interview with Bank Technology News say no US banks have been affected.
