= Turla (malware) =

Malware package

Turla or Uroboros (Russian: Турла) is a trojan package that is suspected by computer security researchers and Western intelligence officers to be the product of a Russian government agency of the same name.

High infection rates of the virus were observed in Russia, Kazakhstan and Vietnam, followed by US and China, and low infection rates in Europe, South America and Asia (including India).

== Malware ==
Turla has been targeting governments and militaries since at least 2008.

In December 2014 there was evidence of it targeting operating systems running Linux.

== Group ==
The advanced persistent threat hacking group has also been named Turla. The group has probably been operating since the late 1990s, according to professor Thomas Rid of Johns Hopkins University. Dan Goodin in Ars Technica described Turla as "Russian spies". Turla has since been given other names such as Snake, Krypton, and Venomous Bear.

In December 2024 researchers from Microsoft and Black Lotus Labs, the threat intelligence unit of Lumen Technologies, reported that Turla, also known as Secret Blizzard, had gained access to infrastructure operated by Storm-0156, a Pakistan-based espionage group. Beginning in 2022 Turla used this access to spy on targets in Afghanistan and India. In Afghanistan these included government and intelligence agencies; in India they included military and defense-related institutions.

=== US actions against group ===
In May 2023 the United States Department of Justice announced that the United States had managed to infiltrate machines that were infected by the malware and issue a command ordering the malware to delete itself. In the operation, codenamed Medusa, the FBI used Perseus, a tool it had built to decrypt Snake communications, to send commands that made the malware overwrite its own vital components without harming the host computer. Affidavits from the FBI and DOJ revealed that the group was part of the Russian Federal Security Service Center 16 group in Ryazan. A joint advisory published in May 2023 by the Cybersecurity and Infrastructure Security Agency, the Federal Bureau of Investigation and partner agencies in other countries attributed Snake to a unit within FSB Center 16. It said daily operations using Snake had been run from an FSB facility in Ryazan.

== Possible GoldenJackal connection ==
ESET noted that the command and control protocol used by GoldenJackal malware is typically used by Turla, suggesting the groups may be connected.

== See also ==
- Agent.BTZ
- Red October (malware)
