= Afripol =

African continental police organization

AFRIPOL
Law enforcement organization overview
- Formed: 2017
- Jurisdiction: African Union
- Headquarters: Algiers, Algeria 36.73225°N 3.08746°E
- Motto: Enhancing African Police Cooperation
- Law enforcement organization executive: (Algeria) Director General Jalel Chelba, Executive Director
- Parent department: African Union Department of Political Affairs, Peace and Security, African Union
- Key document: Statute of the African Union Mechanism for Police Cooperation (AFRIPOL)
- Website: afripol.peaceau.org/en/

Map
- Afripol (Africa)

The African Union Mechanism for Police Cooperation, commonly referred to as AFRIPOL, is a continental police organization established to strengthen cooperation in law enforcement agencies of African Union (AU) member states.

The project to establish Afripol was launched in 2013, and the organization began operations in 2017. Algeria was chosen as its headquarters. All 55 countries joined the organization. The legal framework is established by The Algiers Declaration of 2014 and the AFRIPOL Statute of 2017.

AFRIPOL cooperates with INTERPOL, the European Union Agency for Law Enforcement Cooperation (Europol), the European Border and Coast Guard Agency (Frontex), the International Organization for Migration (IOM), and the United Nations Office on Drugs and Crime (UNODC).
