= Mohd Noor Amin =

Malaysian businessman

Yang Berbahagia Datuk Mohd Noor Amin
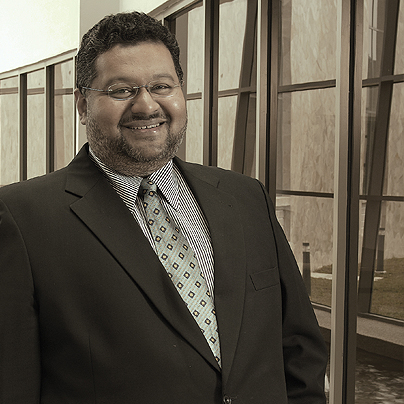
- Born: Mohd Noor Amin bin Mohd Noor Khan; 19 March 1969 (age 56); Kuala Lumpur
- Education: Master's in Commercial and Corporate Law from King's College, United Kingdom (1994); Called to the Bar of England and Wales at Gray's Inn (1993); Bachelor of Laws from the University of Liverpool, United Kingdom (1992); Admitted as an Advocate & Solicitor of the Malaysian Bar (1995)
- Occupations: Chairman, International Multilateral Partnership Against Cyber Threats (IMPACT)(2008-present)
- Employer: International Multilateral Partnership Against Cyber Threats (IMPACT) (2008-present)

Datuk Mohd Noor Amin bin Mohd Noor Khan has been the Chairman of the International Multilateral Partnership Against Cyber Threats since its establishment 2008. Datuk Amin heads the world's largest United Nations (UN) backed public-private partnership against cyber threats. In May 2011, Amin along with Hamadoun Toure was successful in the appointment of IMPACT as UN's cybersecurity executing arm by UN specialised agency – International Telecommunication Union (ITU). As Chairman of IMPACT, he guides the organisation and its stakeholders (international organisations and member states) to enhance the global community's capacity to prevent, defend against and respond to cyber threats.

In 2000, Datuk Amin acquired an ICT software company, Ascendsys, and became its non-executive chairman. Ascendsys is Southeast Asia's leading managed security services (‘MSS’) company.

In the area of foreign relations, Datuk Amin became the founding Secretary-General of the Malaysia-U.S. Friendship Council, headquartered in Washington D.C. The Council was established in 2002 and was sponsored by leading Malaysian companies to provide advice on matters relating to bilateral relationship between the two countries. In 2004, he was appointed by the President of the Republic of Guatemala to serve as the nation's honorary envoy to Malaysia.

== Biography ==
Datuk Amin was born in 1969 in Kuala Lumpur, Malaysia. Amin is an English trained barrister and has been admitted to the English Bar at Gray's Inn and to the Malaysian Bar. He holds a master's in Commercial and Corporate Law from King's College, University of London (U.K.). Upon completing his education, he returned to Malaysia in 1994 and began his law pupillage at Malaysia's law firm, Zaid Ibrahim & Co. In 1995, he was admitted to the Malaysian Bar as an Advocate & Solicitor. He also served as personal legal counsel to two previous Malaysian Prime Ministers and served as general counsel to Malaysia's ruling party. In 2001, he married Shariza binti Tan Sri Kamaruzzaman, and they have a daughter, Nor Amira Suraiya.

Upon the commendation of the Malaysian Prime Minister Dato' Sri Haji Mohammad Najib bin Tun Haji Abdul Razak, the thirteenth King of Malaysia His Majesty Sultan Mizan Zainal Abidin in 2009 bestowed Datuk Amin the 'Panglima Jasa Negara' (PJN) award, he was this youngest recipient of this Federal Award. The PJN Award carries with it the honorific title 'Datuk'.

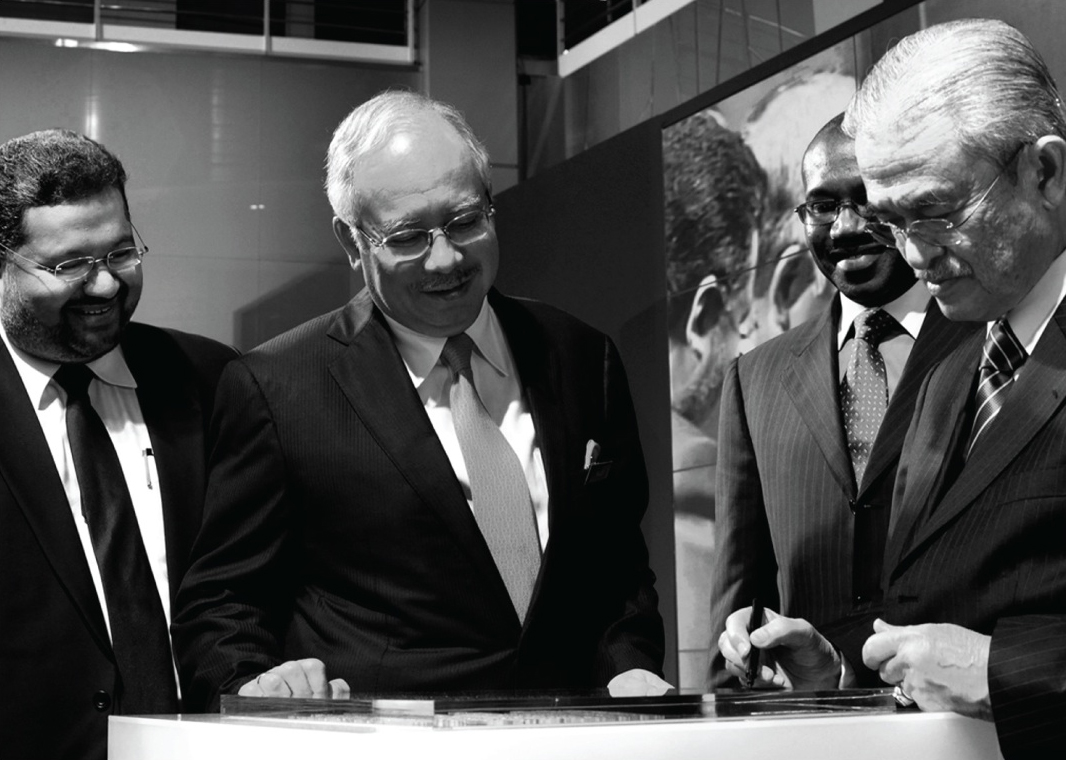
From left to right: Mohd Noor Amin, Dato' Sri Mohd Najib, Dr. Hamadoun Toure and Dato' Seri Abdullah Badawi officiating the launch of IMPACT as the new global hub of cybersecurity

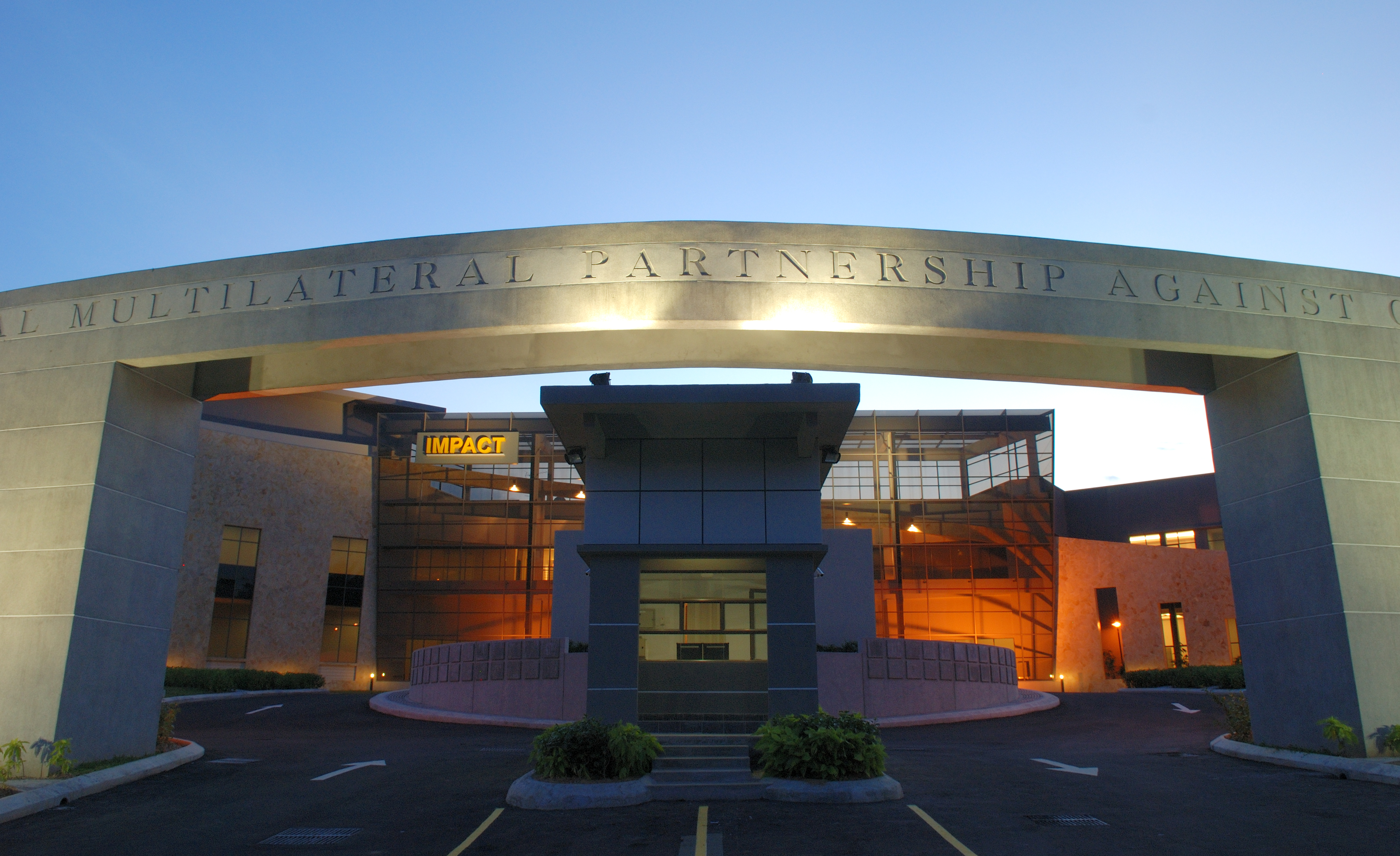
The IMPACT Global Headquarters in Cyberjaya, Malaysia
