= Cascade (computer virus) =

DOS computer virus and malware

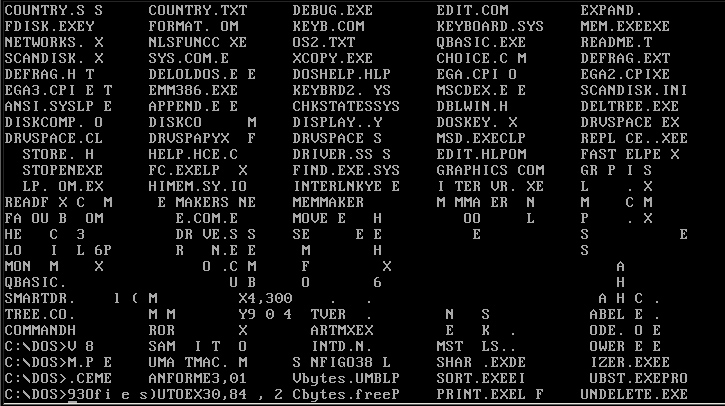
- The payload Cascade displays on an infected system

Malware details
- Aliases: Herbstlaub, Cascade-17Y4
- Classification: Virus
- Isolation date: 1987
- Author: Unknown

Technical details
- Platform: DOS
- Written in: Assembly language

The Cascade virus (also known as Herbstlaub, "autumn leaves" in Germany) is a prominent computer virus that was a resident written in assembly language, that was widespread in the 1980s and early 1990s. It infected .COM files and made text on the screen cascade (fall) down and form a heap at the bottom of the screen. It was first isolated in 1987.

It was notable for using an encryption algorithm to avoid being detected. However, one could see that infected files had their size increased by 1701 or 1704 bytes. In response, IBM developed its own antivirus software.

The virus has several variants. Cascade-17Y4, which is reported to have originated in Yugoslavia, is almost identical to the most common 1704-byte variant; however, one byte has been changed, possibly due to a random mutation, causing a bug in the virus. Another mutated variant that infects the same file repeatedly is also known.
