= Red October (malware) =

Cyberespionage malware

Operation Red October or Red October was a cyberespionage malware program discovered in October 2012 and uncovered in January 2013 by Russian firm Kaspersky Lab. The malware was reportedly operating worldwide for up to five years prior to discovery, transmitting information ranging from diplomatic secrets to personal information, including from mobile devices. The primary vectors used to install the malware were emails containing attached documents that exploited vulnerabilities in Microsoft Word and Excel. Later, a webpage was found that exploited a known vulnerability in the Java browser plugin. Red October was termed an advanced cyberespionage campaign intended to target diplomatic, governmental and scientific research organizations worldwide.

A map of the extent of the operation was released by the Kaspersky Lab – the "Moscow-based antivirus firm that uncovered the campaign."

After being revealed, domain registrars and hosting companies shut down as many as 60 domains, used by the virus creators to receive information. The attackers, themselves, shut down their end of the operation, as well.

The perpetrator of the operation has not been conclusively determined but it appeared to have been in operation on some level since May 2007 at the latest. According to Kaspersky Lab, Russian slang words were found in the code which would be "generally unknown to non-native Russian speakers." However, the program also appeared to be built on existing exploits developed by Chinese hackers and previously used against Tibetan activists.

Operation Red October Cyber Breaches
Country	Government	Embassy (Diplomatic)	Military	Nuclear / Energy Research	Aerospace	Oil & Gas Industry	Trade and Commerce	Research Institutions	Unknown Victims
United States	No	Yes	No	No	No	No	No	No	No
Russia	No	Yes	Yes	Yes	No	No	No	Yes	No
Belarus	Yes	Yes	Yes	Yes	No	Yes	No	Yes	No
Kazakhstan	Yes	Yes	Yes	Yes	Yes	No	No	No	No
United Arab Emirates	Yes	Yes	No	Yes	No	Yes	No	No	No
Azerbaijan	No	Yes	No	Yes	No	Yes	No	Yes	No
Turkmenistan	Yes	No	No	Yes	No	Yes	No	No	No
Afghanistan	Yes	Yes	Yes	No	No	No	No	No	No
Moldova	Yes	Yes	Yes	No	No	No	No	No	No
France	No	Yes	Yes	No	No	No	No	No	No
Spain	Yes	Yes	No	No	No	No	No	No	No
Armenia	Yes	Yes	No	No	No	No	No	No	No
Cyprus	Yes	Yes	No	No	No	No	No	No	No
Iraq	Yes	No	No	No	No	No	No	No	No
Brunei	Yes	No	No	No	No	No	No	No	No
Luxembourg	Yes	No	No	No	No	No	No	No	No
India	No	Yes	No	No	No	No	No	No	No
Uganda	No	Yes	No	No	No	No	No	No	No
Pakistan	No	Yes	No	No	No	No	No	No	No
Oman	No	Yes	No	No	No	No	No	No	No
Saudi Arabia	No	Yes	No	No	No	No	No	No	No
Italy	No	Yes	No	No	No	No	No	No	No
Portugal	No	Yes	No	No	No	No	No	No	No
Morocco	No	Yes	No	No	No	No	No	No	No
Israel	No	Yes	No	No	No	No	No	No	No
Jordan	No	Yes	No	No	No	No	No	No	No
Greece	No	Yes	No	No	No	No	No	No	No
Ireland	No	Yes	No	No	No	No	No	No	No
Belgium	No	Yes	No	No	No	No	No	No	No
Germany	No	Yes	No	No	No	No	No	No	No
Hungary	No	Yes	No	No	No	No	No	No	No
Mauritania	No	Yes	No	No	No	No	No	No	No
Congo	No	Yes	No	No	No	No	No	No	No
South Africa	No	Yes	No	No	No	No	No	No	No
Botswana	No	Yes	No	No	No	No	No	No	No
Mozambique	No	Yes	No	No	No	No	No	No	No
Tanzania	No	Yes	No	No	No	No	No	No	No
Kenya	No	Yes	No	No	No	No	No	No	No
Lithuania	No	Yes	No	No	No	No	No	No	No
Latvia	No	Yes	No	No	No	No	No	No	No
Turkey	No	Yes	No	No	No	No	No	No	No
Iran	No	Yes	No	No	No	No	No	No	No
Uzbekistan	No	Yes	No	No	No	No	No	No	No
Kuwait	No	Yes	No	No	No	No	No	No	No
Switzerland	No	Yes	No	No	No	No	No	No	No
Lebanon	No	Yes	No	No	No	No	No	No	No
Austria	No	Yes	No	No	No	No	No	No	No
Georgia	No	Yes	No	No	No	No	No	No	No
Bosnia & Herzegovina	No	Yes	No	No	No	No	No	No	No
Serbia	No	No	No	No	No	No	No	No	Yes
Finland	No	No	No	No	No	No	No	No	Yes
Czech Republic	No	No	No	No	No	No	No	No	Yes
Slovakia	No	No	No	No	No	No	No	No	Yes
Macedonia	No	No	No	No	No	No	No	No	Yes
Albania	No	No	No	No	No	No	No	No	Yes
Mali	No	No	No	No	No	No	No	No	Yes
Australia	No	No	No	No	No	No	No	No	Yes
Chile	No	No	No	No	No	No	No	No	Yes
Brazil	No	No	No	No	No	No	No	No	Yes
Ethiopia	No	No	No	No	No	No	No	No	Yes
Bulgaria	No	No	No	No	No	No	No	No	Yes
Bahrain	No	No	No	No	No	No	No	No	Yes
Slovakia	No	No	No	No	No	No	No	No	Yes
