= Ashmanov & Partners =

Russian software company

- Website type: private limited company, online marketing
- Founded: 2001; 25 years ago
- Headquarters: ul. Vereyaskaya, 29/134, Moscow, Russia, 121357
- Area served: Russia, Vietnam
- Founder: Igor Ashmanov
- Key people: Igor Ashmanov, managing partner
- Industry: Internet
- Services: online marketing, online advertising, search engines optimization
- Employees: 300+ (July 2017)
- Subsidiaries: Kribrum; Remparo; Wicron; Metahouse; Informatic; Nanosemantics; Wada! Roem.ru
- Website: www.ashmanov.com

Ashmanov & Partners («АиП», A&P) is a Russian privately held company specializing in Information technologies, online marketing, software development (i.e., search engines), and AI-powered software. Founded in 2001 by Igor Ashmanov and ex-Rambler managers, it has multiple subsidiaries in the same industry.

== History ==
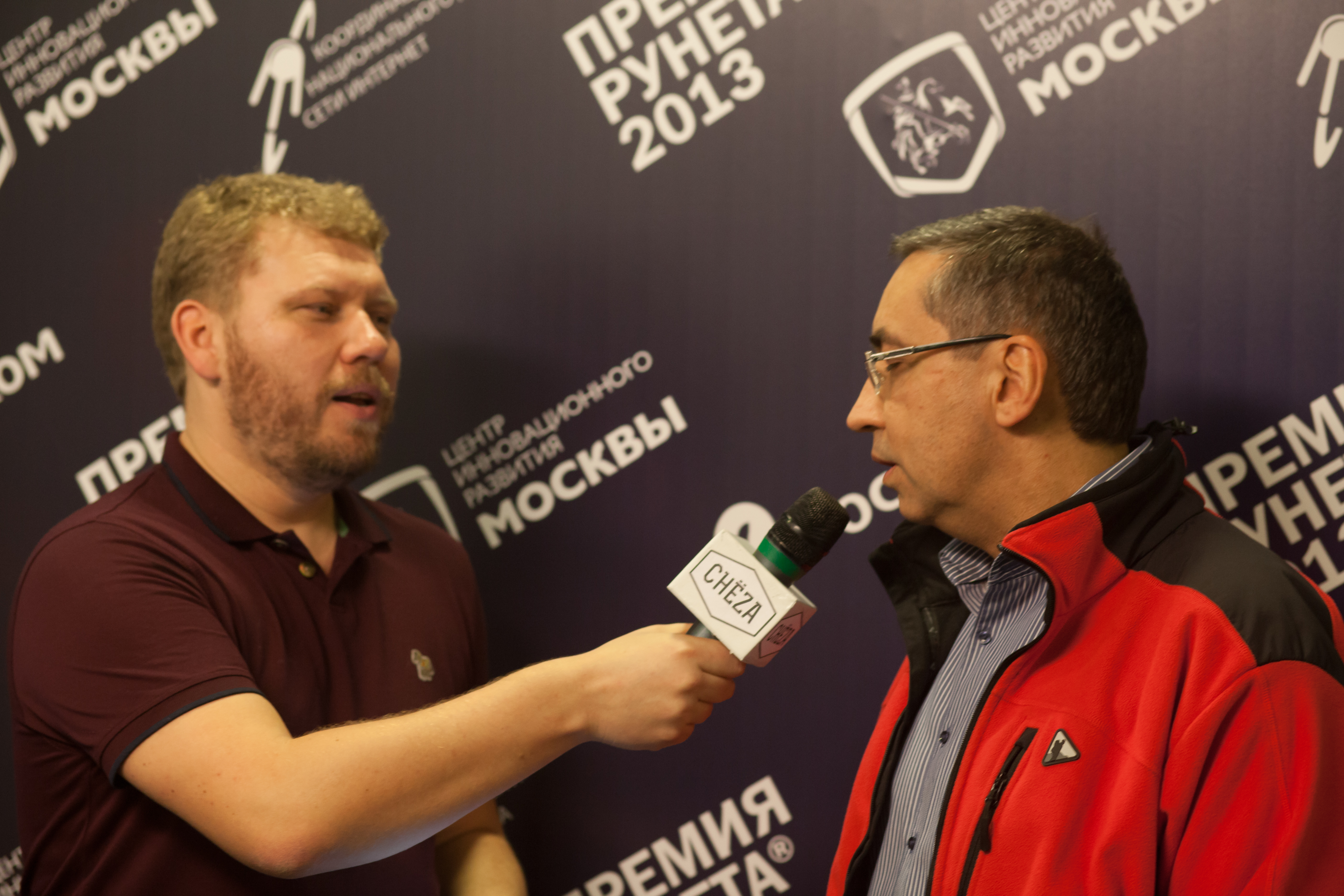
The company's founder, Igor Ashmanov, at the Runet Prize, 2013

Ashmanov & Partners was founded in 2001 by Igor Ashmanov who, a month prior to that, left the position of chief executive officer at Rambler, a web portals in Runet at the time.

Having little-to-no start-up capital, Ashmanov launched his own company and was joined by former colleagues from Rambler who later became business partners.

== Statistics ==
Over 300 people are currently employed in three offices of the company in Russia. As reported by The Firm's Secret magazine in 2011, Ashmanov & Partners serviced over 1,000 clients monthly and had a total market share of 5—10 % in Russian on-line marketing industry.

In 2007, the annual gross volume of Ashmanov & Partners was estimated by Finam Holdings at US$2.5 million. According to annual web studios' rating by Factus, based on publicly available tax reports, gross volume of Ashmanov & Partners in 2015 was over ₽300 million, VAT not included.

== Products and services ==
=== Antispam ===
In 2001, Ashmanov & Partners developed antispam technologies and got a contract from Kaspersky Lab. The first version of Spamtest for FreeBSD and Linux, as well as public Spamtest.ru service were released in 2002. A year later it was integrated into Mail.ru, and the up-to-date version of the product is currently used by large companies such as Beeline, MTS, Moscow Interbank Currency Exchange, Masterhost, Peterlink etc.

In 2005, the project was acquired by Kaspersky Lab for estimated US$3 million. Later, Spamtest became part of Kaspersky Linux Mail Server Security.

=== SEO ===
Ashmanov & Partners was among the first Russian companies to provide search engine optimization services commercially.

=== Context advertising ===
Since 2002, Ashmanov & Partners have been developing various technologies assisting in placing advertisement.

=== Education activities ===
Since 2002, the company organizes annual conferences on search engine optimization and online marketing with mostly case studies and workshops by industry's leading experts:

- eTarget. Technologies for on-line audience management, co-organized with Price.ru and Rambler)
- Optimization. Search engine optimization and online marketing, co-organized with Russian Association for Electronic Communications)

The company also organizes its sections at Russian Internet Forum and Russian Internet Week (RIW).

In 2006, Igor Ashmanov and Andrey Ivanov had their "Search engine optimization of website" book published by the Piter publishing house.

=== Kribrum ===
In 2010, Ashmanov & Partners and InfoWatch co-founded Kribrum (Latin: решето), a social media monitoring service for brand management, data leaks prevention and information security.

Company's clients are large Russian and international companies with multiple brands who get from hundreds to tens of thousands mentions online daily, which makes it impractical to track them manually. Kribrum is capable of automatically analyzing text in English, Russian, and Arabic, and can be configured for particular industry's specifics. As reported by Vedomosti in 2013, monitoring a brand on social media with Kribrum costs between 50K and 200K rubles monthly.

Kribrum's own subsidiaries are Diktum (founded in 2011, technologies for analyzing texts in natural language) and Informatiс (acquired in 2010, releases ORFO spell checker used in e.g. Russian version of Microsoft Office. Development of ORFo was managed by Igor Ashmanov in 1991—1995.

In March 2016, it was announced that a new federal-level social media monitoring and information attacks prevention system would be developed by Ashmanov & Partners and InfoWatch in Innopolis, Tatarstan. Later same year, Kribrum received a large investment from InfoWatch and the Foundation of The Ministry for Communications and the Media.

=== AI and applied robotics ===
Since 2001, one of the main development direction in Ashmanov & Partners is artificial intelligence — creating a man-machine natural language interaction system.

== Owners ==
Ashmanov & Partners was registered in 2001 as a privately held company and was reorganized into a private limited company in 2015. The majority shareholder is its founder and managing partner Igor Ashmanov.

Minor shares are held by top managers — Alexey Ivanov (Semantic Mirror etc.), Alexey Tutubalin (search engine, highload systems), Kirill Zorky (artificial intelligence), Dmitry Pashko (web services for SEO) and Michale Volovich (applied linguistics, usability). Until 2013, 30% of the shares were held by Finam Holdings.

== Controversies ==
In August 2010, Ashmanov & Partners and a Ukrainian investment group, Internet Invest, founded a joint company in Kyiv. The new company was called «Ashmanov and Partners Ukraine» and provided services in search engine optimization, advertising management and branding.

In March 2014, after the outburst of the Russo-Ukrainian War, the company changed its name to «Olshansky and Partners» (Alexander Olshansky was Internet Invest's CEO at the time). It was reported that the company did it to avoid a direct association with Igor Ashmanov, who actively supported Russia's interests in Eastern Ukraine and was known as a co-founder of the Russian nationalist Great Fatherland Party.

== Subsidiaries ==
Ashmanov & Partners has a number of subsidiaries, both acquired and started by the company. The subsidiaries are not part of any formal corporate group, but they use resources by both Ashmanov & Partners and sibling companies. Some of these companies are:

- Nanosemantics (since 2005) — development of chat bots for websites, phones, and consumer electronics;
- Wicron (since 2012) — development of remote presence robots;
- Lexy (since 2014) — development of a virtual voice assistant in a smart speaker form factor;
- Kribrum (since 2010) — social media monitoring system for online reputation management.;
- Informatic (since 2010) — development of ORFO spell checker and stylistics assistant;
- Osmino (since 2012) — development of mobile search apps;
- Metahouse (с 2010 года) — extraction and monitoring of structured data from websites (prices, schedules etc.) for e-commerce projects;
- Roem.ru (since 2007) — on-line magazine about Russian online business;
- Firrma.ru (since 2012) — on-line magazine specializing on startups and venture investment.

== Awards and ratings ==
=== Awards ===
- ROTOR, winner of Corporate website of the year nomination, 2008
- Runet Prize, winner of Technologies and innovations nomination, 2009
- Runet Prize, winner of Science and education nomination, 2013
