= Trade Union of Russian Citizens =

Trade Union of Russian Citizens Профсоюз граждан России
- Abbreviation: PGR (English); ПГР (Russian)
- Leader: Nikolai Starikov
- Founders: Nikolai Starikov; Vladimir Borzdy; Alexei Fyodorov; Viktor Sherenko; Oleg Baikov
- Founded: 12 April 2011; 15 years ago
- Succeeded by: Great Fatherland Party
- Headquarters: Saint Petersburg, Russia
- Newspaper: Vestovoy
- Ideology: Patriotism; Conservatism; Russian nationalism National conservatism Anti-LGBT; Anti-globalization; Anti-americanism; Eurasianism; Hard euroscepticism
- Political position: Right-wing
- National affiliation: All-Russia People's Front
- Colours: White; Blue; Red; Grey

Website
- профсоюзгражданроссии.рф

The Trade Union of Russian Citizens (PGR; Russian: Профсоюз граждан России; ПГР; Profsoyuz grazhdan Rossii, PGR) — voluntary all-Russian public association, existing since April 12, 2011.

This association is critical of some of the government's initiatives: for example, the movement opposed a number of government initiatives, in particular against Russia's accession to the WTO.

== History of creation ==
According to the official version, on April 12, 2011, five like-minded people – residents of Saint Petersburg and the Leningrad Oblast (writer, publicist, commercial director of the St. Petersburg branch of Channel One Nikolai Starikov, businessman Vladimir Borzdy, owner of a small security company Alexey Fyodorov, businessman Viktor Sherenko. and businessman Oleg Baikov) met in the cafe “Svoi”, located not far from Anichkov Bridge. During the conversation, they decided to create a public movement, then left the cafe and proceeded to the notary office, located on Marata Street, in order to carry out the procedures required by legal legislation.

2 years later, on April 10, 2013, on the basis of the public movement "Trade Union of Russian Citizens", the All-Russian political party "Great Fatherland Party" was registered.

== Political program ==
- Nationalization of the country's financial system, nationalization of the ruble (clause 9 of the PGR Program):

Detachment of the ruble from the dollar FRS, withdrawal from all international financial institutions. Deprivation of the Central Bank of the Russian Federation of independence and its real subordination to the state. Changes to articles of the Constitution and laws related to the Central Bank.

- Nationalization of natural resources, nationalization of subsoil (clause 10 of the PGR Program):

Extractive companies do not become the owners of oil or gas, but contractors who are entrusted by the state to extract resources, paying certain funds for their work.

- Monopoly of foreign trade in strategic natural resources (clause 11 of the PGR Program), which have come under state control. They must be sold for rubles.

Russia itself sells its natural resources, directing the funds received to the needs of the people of Russia.

- Cancellation of the moratorium on the death penalty (paragraph 15 of the PGR Program)

Abandoning the moratorium on the death penalty for those who have committed the gravest crimes: treason, crimes against children, terrorism, corruption (on an especially large scale).

- Free education (clause 16 of the PGR Program)

Refusal from the paid education system and the availability of the latter for all citizens of the Russian Federation.

- Inadmissibility of promoting values that contradict the traditions of the peoples of Russia (clause 19 of the PGR Program)

Legislative ban on propaganda: — Interest-Based Economy, — homosexual relations.

== Printed edition of PGR ==
The Trade Union of Russian Citizens in October 2011 published the Vestovoy magazine, edited by Boris Shvaryov.

== Trade Union political actions ==
The action "March of Success" takes place on the 1st of every month, starting from November 1, 2011, in Moscow, St. Petersburg, Novosibirsk, Yaroslavl, Ivanovo, Kaliningrad and Krasnodar. In violation of the established tradition, the action took place on April 2, 2012, in order to avoid misunderstandings.

=== Actions against Russia's accession to the WTO ===
July 7, 2011, picket on Nevsky Prospekt in St. Petersburg.

August 9, 2011, pickets in several cities of Russia.

March 20, 2012, at the building of the Ministry of Economic Development in Moscow.

March 23, 2012, on Bolshaya Moskovskaya street in St. Petersburg, near the metro station "Vladimirskaya" will hold against Russia's accession to the World Trade Organization. In Yaroslavl, on Yunost Square, a picket was also held against Russia's participation in the WTO.

On April 19, 2012, a picket was held in St. Petersburg against the country's accession to the WTO on one of the busiest pedestrian streets of the city – Malaya Sadovaya Street, in the very center, 50 meters from Nevsky Prospekt and attracted serious attention not only of Petersburgers, but also of guests of the Northern capital. It was attended by about 30 activists. About 700 leaflets were handed out to passers-by, which indicated 10 reasons why Russia should not join the WTO. Also activists held posters. The slogan on one of them read "We do not want gasoline to cost 60 rubles per liter".

On April 24, 2012, a picket was held in the Pervomaisky square of the city of Novosibirsk against the country's accession to the World Trade Organization.

June 17, 2012, participation in a rally against juvenile justice and Russia's accession to the WTO.

June 30 in St. Petersburg and July 1, 2012, in Moscow rally against juvenile justice and the WTO.

On July 6, 2012, the Trade Union of Russian Citizens, together with the public organization "People's Cathedral", staged a round-the-clock single picket in front of the building of the Constitutional Court of the Russian Federation on Senate Square in Saint Petersburg. The promotion began at 10 am and will end only on July 9. By this day, the court must find out whether the WTO agreement contradicts the Russian Constitution.

On July 9, 2012, activists of the Trade Union of Russian Citizens movement lined up with placards and flags in a chain of single pickets along the entire length of Nevsky Prospect – from Vosstaniya Square to the Admiralty. And their allies from the All-Russian organization "Essence of Time" invited each of the passers-by to send a message to Moscow with the same type of text.

=== Referendum on Russia's accession to the WTO ===
On March 19, 2012, at 15:00 in the Interfax news agency a press conference was held on the creation of an Initiative Group for the All-Russian referendum on Russia's accession to the WTO. It was attended by:

Konstantin Babkin — Leader of the Party of Business, President of the Rosagromash Association, member of the Central Council of the Agrarian Russia Movement and the Union of Machine Builders of Russia, member of the Board of the Russian Union of Industrialists and Entrepreneurs and member of the General Council of Delovaya Rossiya,

Konstantin Shirshov — Russian politician, member of the CK CPRF, deputy of the State Duma, member of the Communist Party faction, member of the State Duma Committee on Construction and Land Relations, member of the State Duma Commission on consideration of federal budget expenditures aimed at ensuring defense and state security of the Russian Federation.

Nikolai Starikov — writer, publicist, member of the Central Council of the public organization "Trade Union of Russian Citizens",

Aleksandr Kurinov — member of the Central Council of the "Trade Union of Russian Citizens",

Maxim Kalashnikov — journalist, public and political figure, writer-futurist, publicist,

On April 4, 2012, in the building of the Russian Chamber of Commerce and Industry, the process of registering a referendum on Russia's accession to the WTO was launched – the first meeting of the organizing committee and a meeting of the Moscow regional subgroup. The meeting of the regional subgroup, which took place in the building of the Chamber of Commerce and Industry in Moscow, was attended by over 300 people. The initiators were the public organization "Russian People's Council", "Trade Union of Russian Citizens" and the Party of Business. On April 13, the Central Election Commission of the Russian Federation found it impossible to hold a referendum in Russia on the country's accession to the World Trade Organization.

On April 18, 2012, the initiative group for the referendum appealed to the Supreme Court with a demand to cancel the decision of the Central Election Commission of the Russian Federation, which refused to hold a nationwide referendum on the country's accession to the WTO. In addition to the claim to the Supreme Court, one should expect the submission of claims to the court against the WTO on behalf of private citizens of Russia, said Alexander Kurinov, a member of the central council of the Trade Union of Russian Citizens at a press conference on the same day.

=== Pickets in support of Viktor Bout ===
On October 11, 2011, a picket at the US Consulate in St. Petersburg with the slogans: "Return Viktor Bout" and "We demand a fair trial of Viktor Bout".

On December 27, 2011, an agreed mass picket was held at the US Consulate in St. Petersburg with a demand to return Viktor Bout to his homeland. This time, Alla Bout, the wife of Viktor Bput, joined the activists of the Trade Union of Russian Citizens. The picketing has been going on for 46 days and, according to the organizers of the picket, will continue until Viktor Bout returns to Russia.

On March 27, 2012, another mass picket was held at the US Consulate in St. Petersburg in support of Viktor Bout. 30 activists of the public organization Trade Union of Russian Citizens with flags and posters came to Furshtatskaya Street and waited for a meeting with the consul. Their main question was: "Why is Russian Bout still being held in the United States?". A little earlier, on March 22, the organization's delegations in Moscow and St. Petersburg handed letters to US Ambassador Michael McFaul and US Consul General Bruce Turner, in which they insisted on a personal meeting to discuss the issue of Bout's release. In Moscow, a picket with similar requirements was also held at the US Embassy.

On April 24, 2012, members of the Trade Union again unfurled flags and banners demanding the return of a Russian citizen to their homeland at the US Consulate in St. Petersburg. "Shame on the kidnappers!", "Freedom for a citizen of Russia!", "Obama, return the Nobel Peace Prize!" – read the posters. For an hour, the picketers handed out leaflets to passers-by, stating that union members consider Bout's case a political order.

On August 10, 2012, rallies in support of Viktor Bout and Dmitry Zubakha were held in St. Petersburg and Moscow.

=== Actions against Gorbachev ===
On December 31, 2011, at the request of the Trade Union of Russian Citizens, Russian lawyers developed a mechanism for initiating the prosecution of Mikhail Gorbachev. The trade union proposes to judge the first president of the USSR for not fulfilling his duties and allowing the collapse of the state entrusted to him. The trade union will demand the renewal of the old criminal case, which on November 4, 1991, being the Head of the Department of the USSR Procurator General's Office for Supervision of the Execution of State Security Laws, initiated by Viktor Ilyukhin against the president of the USSR Mikhail Gorbachev for treason.

On January 19, 2012, an activist of the PGR, Daria Dedova, filed an application with the Investigative Committee of the Russian Federation to initiate a criminal case against the former president of the USSR Mikhail Gorbachev. In many Russian cities, mass pickets were held in support of the action "Bring Gorbachev to Court!", Organized by the Trade Union of Russian Citizens. The St. Petersburg picket was attended by a member of the PGR, writer and publicist Nikolai Starikov. In Novosibirsk, a picket in support of the action was held on January 20, 2012.

On March 12, 2012, the campaign "Let's Help Gorbachev Find Conscience".

On May 3, 4 and 5, 2012, activists of the PGR came to the building of the Prosecutor-General's Office of the Russian Federation in Moscow, at Bolshaya Dmitrovka 15 a, to express a collective protest to the functionaries of this department. The picketers, located across the street from the General Prosecutor's Office building, held banners demanding to stop sabotaging the criminal prosecution of Mikhail Gorbachev initiated by the Trade Union of Russian Citizens.

=== Other actions ===
September 19, 2011, picketing at the USA and British embassies under the main slogan – "In the fields of Afghan between mines, Obama sows heroin".

On September 20, 2011, an indefinite series of single pickets began at the editorial offices of three media outlets, daily (on weekdays) from 13:00 to 15:00, a single picket will stand outside the Moscow office of Echo Moskvy radio, Novaya Gazeta newspaper and The New Times magazine ".

October 5, 2011, picket at the walls of MIIT with the slogan "Enough of education reforms".

On October 17, 2011, a picketing of the TsUM was held and an open letter was sent to Russian president Dmitry Anatolyevich Medvedev, Prime Minister Vladimir Vladimirovich Putin and Moscow Mayor Sergey Semyonovich Sobyanin demanding to change the design of the shop windows, in which a sexual context was seen.

On November 26, 2011, in Moscow, about 20 activists of the public organization "Trade Union of Russian Citizens" picketed the Ukrainian Embassy in the Russian Federation with slogans urging Ukraine to join the Customs Union.

Since December 23, 2011, debates have been held with various parties, the first debates were held with representatives of the Communist Party of the Russian Federation, January 10, 2012, with representatives of the Liberal Opposition: Alexander Tsvirov – representative of the "Civil Action" group and director of "People's Control" Andrey Buzinov, and also on January 20, 2012, with representatives of the Other Russia party

On February 23, 2012, the Trade Union held an all-Russian action entitled "They fought for their country", activists of the Trade Union handed out leaflets with portraits of the leader of the Cuban Revolution Fidel Castro, Joseph Stalin, the assassinated Libyan leader Muammar Gaddafi and the inscription "They fought for their country against the occupiers and the Fifth columns. What did you do? " near metro stations in Saint Petersburg and Moscow.

On March 21, 2012, at the walls of the Mariinsky Palace in St. Petersburg, the Trade Union of Russian Citizens held a single picket in support of the law banning the promotion of homosexuality and pedophilia among minors.

Participants unfurled a large banner on which it was written: "In which parade will your son participate?" There are two photos on the banner. One of them shows the marching soldiers of the airborne troops, the second photo – participants in a gay parade, where the kiss of two men is captured.

Deputy of the Legislative Assembly of Saint Petersburg Vitaly Milonov, who initiated the adoption of the amendments, supported the picketers of the Trade Union and informed the media about his intention to send the initiative to adopt a law prohibiting the promotion of homosexuality and pedophilia at the federal level.

On April 12, 2012, the creation of the New Great Russia party was announced on the basis of the Trade Union of Russian Citizens, but it was immediately clarified that the Trade Union would continue to exist. The name of the party caused a negative reaction from the Great Russia party, but no one is going to change the name. Igor Ashmanov, one of the founding fathers of the IT industry in Russia, joined the party's organizing committee.

On April 21, 2012, a motor rally in support of the faith took place in Moscow. ПThe trade union of Russian citizens took an active part in organizing this event. Members of the PGR in their cars in a huge column (about 400 cars) drove through the capital together with other Russian patriots who consider attacks on faith unacceptable.

On May 3, 2012, the Trade Union of Russian Citizens appealed to the governor of Saint Petersburg, Georgy Poltavchenko, with a request not to allow the ANTI-family "Family Concept in St. Petersburg" to be adopted until 2022. At the same time, a single picket was held near Smolny in defense of family values.

On May 8, 2012, on the eve of the Great Victory in the Great Patriotic War, the St. Petersburg branch of the Trade Union of Russian Citizens held a mass picket “For the Motherland! For Stalin!" on Malaya Sadovaya in St. Petersburg.Activists believe that the name of the Soviet leader is being hushed up. They put on T-shirts with the image of Stalin, some participants placed photographs of their grandfathers who participated in the Great Patriotic War on their clothes.

On May 13, 2012, in Novosibirsk, the "Trade Union of Russian Citizens" took part in the picket "In defense of morality, against the blasphemous exhibition 'Motherland' of Marat Gelman" together with the organizations "People's Cathedral", "Essence of Time", "Eurasian Youth Union", and "Sober town".

June 7 and 15, 2012 picketing of Saint Petersburg State University demanding the resignation of Daniil Kotsyubinsky from the post of teacher for supporting separatist sentiments in the city of St. Petersburg, together with the "Narodny Sobor" and "Essence of Time".

On August 7, 2012, activists of the public movements "People's Cathedral" and "Trade Union of Russian Citizens" went to Nevsky Prospekt demanding to cancel Madonna's speech. The participants stood at a distance of 50 meters. Thus, the "chain" stretched from the metro station "Ploschad Vosstaniya" to "Admiralteyskaya". The picketers handed out leaflets against Madonna to passers-by: "She promotes suicide for your children", "Tell me who your idol is, and I'll tell you who you are.". The author of the Law against the Promotion of Homosexuality in St. Petersburg, Deputy Vitaly Milonov, expressed support for the picket participants and announced that he intends to send his subordinates to the concert, who will take photographs and videos, in order to then punish the singer for promoting non-traditional sexual relations.

On August 8, 2012, a picket was held at the US Consulate General in St. Petersburg on the anniversary of the aggression against South Ossetia. Activists were holding placards and flags. According to eyewitnesses, the action was peaceful, no one dispersed its participants. The posters called for an end to America's spread of wars and revolutions.

On August 9, 2012, activists from the Trade Union of Russian Citizens, People's Cathedral, and the New Great Russia party came out to Palace Square in St. Petersburg with flags of movements and posters in Russian and English against Madonna, who, according to the participants of the action, promotes homosexuality. In addition, the picketers handed out leaflets urging not to confuse pathology with the norm and "Down with homodictatorship". The choice of the Palace Square is not accidental. Several years ago Madonna performed there for the first time in St. Petersburg. “The time has come to consecrate this place. We will invite the priest to sprinkle the Palace Square with holy water and get rid of the filth, "- said the representative of the movement. The "Trade Union of Russian Citizens" is convinced that Madonna turned her ideas into political actions, becoming "the ideological weapon of the West". "We are against the genocide of morality and ethics. Foreigners have no right to dictate the rules of life to us". Unfortunately, the priest never showed up for the action.

On August 17, 2012, activists of the Trade Union of Russian Citizens, the New Great Russia Party and the People's Cathedral filed a claim for compensation for moral harm and moral suffering (Article 151 of the Civil Code) against the singer Madonna and the organizers of her concert in the northern capital. Attached to the statement of claim are videos showing how Madonna tramples on the Orthodox cross and asks to raise her hands with pink bracelets. Activists intended to collect 333 million rubles in court.

=== Participation in rallies ===
On December 17, 2011, in Moscow on Pushkinskaya Square a rally "FOR A UNIFIED POWER!" together with the People's Council organization, the Eurasian Youth Union, the parent movement "Family. Love. Fatherland", Orthodox and military-patriotic associations – only about a thousand people, including groups that arrived from the Moscow Oblast, Tver Oblast, Ivanovo Oblast and Voronezh Oblast.

The rally "Eurasian Union – Together Again" was held in the Alexander Park of St. Petersburg.

On February 4, 2012, the Trade Union took part in the Anti-Orange rally on Poklonnaya Hill in Moscow.

On February 18, 2012, the Trade Union of Russian Citizens took part in the 60-thousandth rally "For Great Russia" on Grecheskaya Square, near the Oktyabrskiy Big Concert Hall, in St. Petersburg.

On April 21, 2012, a rally “For the Motherland, Faith, Sovereignty!” Was held on Pushkinskaya Square in Moscow, one of the organizers of which was the Trade Union of Russian Citizens together with the People's Cathedral, the Party of Business and other patriotic organizations. About one and a half thousand people who came to the center of Moscow spoke out against the abuse of faith, the destruction of the family and the collapse of the country's economy.

On August 11, 2012, activists of the organization came to a rally dedicated to the 75th anniversary of the beginning of the Great Terror in T-shirts with portraits of Stalin.

== Media about the Trade Union ==
- "Trade Union of Russian Citizens" – Who needs trade unions, and is there an honest way to a stable life?
- Actions of the Trade Union of Russian Citizens will be held near the offices of Echo Moskvy, Novaya Gazeta and The New Times — Газета.ru
- Trade union of Russian citizens will oppose Chubais and WTO accession — Росбалт — Петербург
- «IF WE ACCEPT THE WTO, WE WILL EAT GMO» — Крестьянский фронт
- Show "Own Truth"— Русская служба новостей

== Videos on TV ==
- RenTV about the March of Success
- 100TV Picket against WTO
- The "March of Success" was held in St. Petersburg — 100ТВ
- No gasoline for 60 rubles
- Post-election economics. About the goals of the PGR- РБК
- PGR picket near the building of St. Petersburg State University journalism faculty
- Russians should be tried in Russia
- The arms lord should be tried in Russia- НТВ
- Portraits of Stalin appeared on Malaya Sadovaya. About the action on May 8, 2012
- An action dedicated to all the good things that happens in Russia took place in Petersburg- НТВ
- A picket was held in Petersburg against Madonna's concert- Россия 1
