= Nanosemantics =

Russian IT AI company

- Industry: Artificial intelligence
- Founded: 2005
- Founders: Igor Ashmanov, Natalya Kaspersky
- Headquarters: Russia
- Key people: Stanislav Ashmanov

Nanosemantics Lab is a Russian IT company specializing in natural language processing (NLP), computer vision (CV), speech technologies (ASR/TTS) and creation of interactive dialog interfaces, particularly chatbots and virtual assistants, based on artificial intelligence (AI). The company uses neural network platforms, including its own-made platform PuzzleLib which works on Russian-made microprocessor architecture Elbrus and Russia-based Astra Linux operating system. The company was founded in 2005 by Igor Ashmanov and Natalya Kaspersky.

== Profile ==
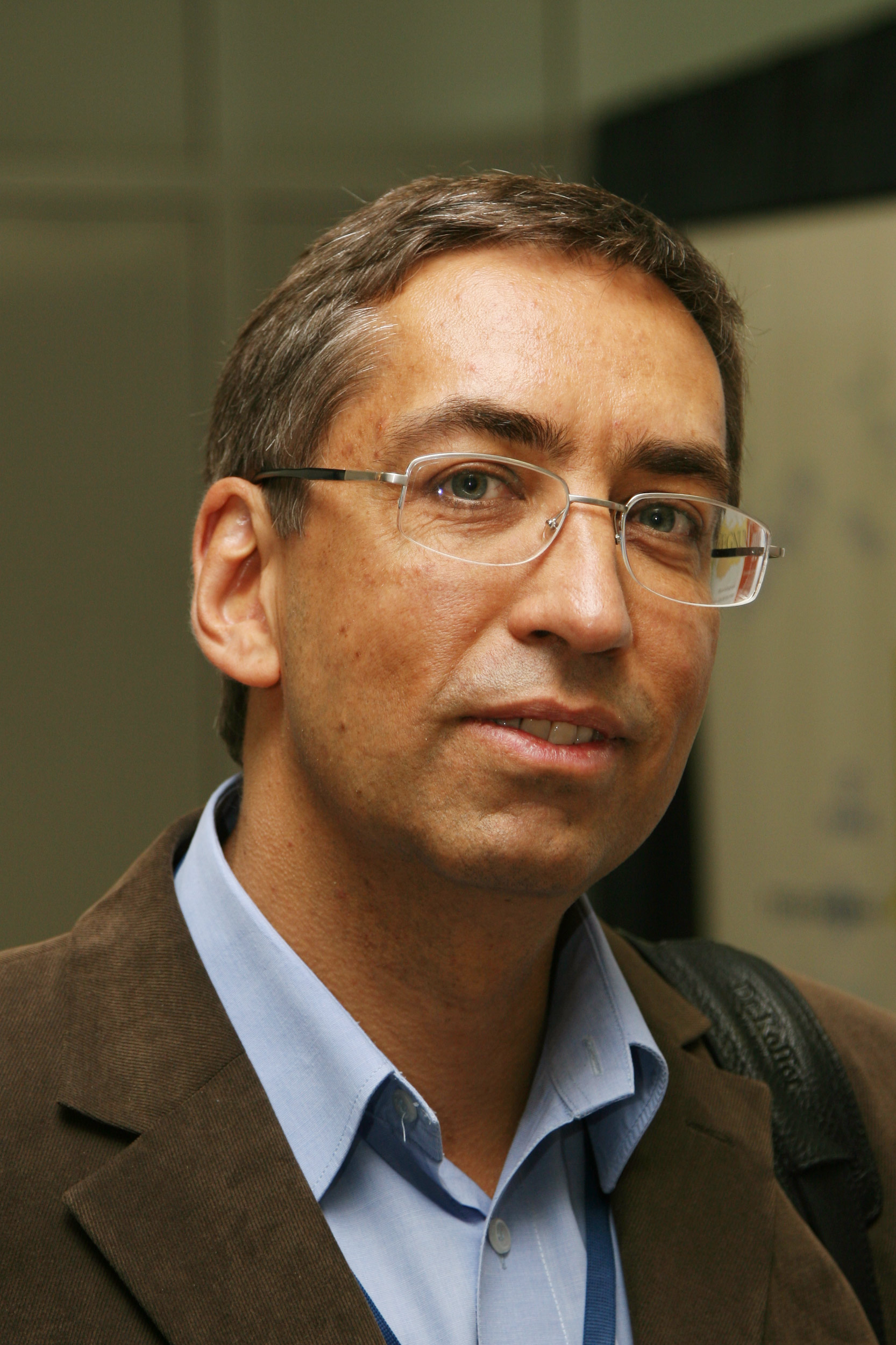
伊戈尔·阿什马诺夫 (Igor Ashmanov)

The company was one of the first on Russian market to develop dialog interfaces for different branches of businesses, as well as to support community of AI developers. The company's most demanded product, as for beginning of the 2020s, is the automated "online advisers", functioning as chat bots, made for helping customers with usage of commercial products. In 2009 the company released an online service called iii.ru, where visitors were able to create their own AI-based virtual personalities entitles "infs" (for free). A visitor was able to train its own "inf" and let them chat to other "live" visitors as well with other "infs". More than 2.3 million of "infs" were created and trained by visitors over several years.

Nanosemantics Lab maintains its own linguistic programming language for AI development called Dialog Language (DL). Popular social networks and instant messaging services may be used as base platforms.

Nanosemantics' AI bots support different types of businesses: banks and financial services, telecommunications, retail, travel and automobile industry, home appliances production, etc. Among its solutions, Nanosemantics lists projects for various companies and institutions, among them VTB, Beeline, MTS, Sberbank, Higher School of Economics, Webmoney, Gazpromneft, Rostelecom, Ford Motors, Ministry of Health of the Russian Federation and others.

The company uses the term "inf" for naming its numerous types of chat bots. The term was coined by co-founder Igor Ashmanov, head of Ashmanov & Partners. A 2014 scholarly research at Higher School of Economics, called "Basics of Business Informatics", states that such "infs", when used at business, may lower load on employees, collect statistics useful for understanding market demand and also may increase customer loyalty by providing fast and informative answers due to usage of large databases. The same research describes Nanosemantics' project for Russian branch of Ford Motors company, when AI capabilities were used for promoting the car model Ford Kuga. The research pointed out that within 2 months since beginning, the promo-website conducted 47774 talks of visitors with the specialized "inf", which indicated several hundred thousand of questions and the longest chat lasted for 3 hours 10 minutes. One-year promo campaign showed that 28.6% of people who made pre-orders talked to an "inf".

In 2016 Nanosemantics launched a SaaS platform aimed at creating customized virtual assistants by users.

The company's flagship product is considered to be Dialog Operating System (DialogOS), a professional corporate platform for creating intellectual voice and textual bots. It has its own linguistic programming language for creation of flexible scenarios and ready-studied neural natural language processing modules that are able to understand human interlocutors.

In 2021 the company presented technology called NLab Speech ASR which contains a set of neural-networking algorithms for processing audio signals and analysis of texts that were trained and calibrated using speech-based big data marked up manually. The technology allows speed of processing of data up to "6 real-time factor" and precision values in noisy audio data may exceed 82%.

In March 2022 the technology was included in Russia's Joint Registry for Russian Programs for Computers and Databases. As well, another technology was included: NLab Speech TTS, which is text-to-speech system that produces synthesized speech from printed text.

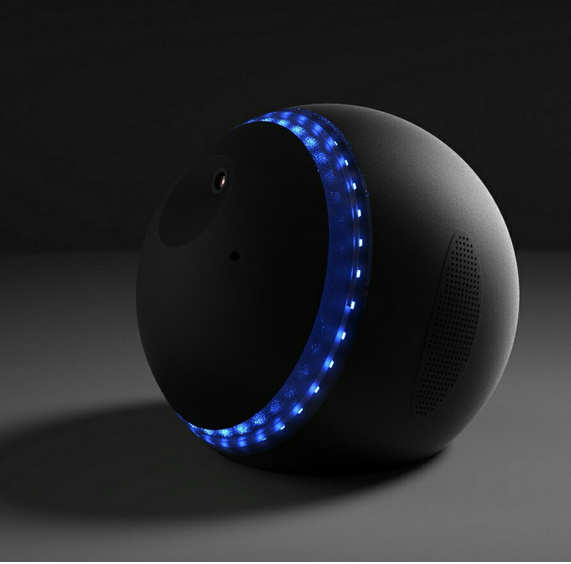
Lexy bot by Ashmanov & Partners

== Joint projects ==
Nanosemantics participates in Ashmanov & Partners' projects related to AI. Since 2014, it helps in development of hardware "personal assistant" called Lexy, a solution similar to Amazon Alexa and the analogues.

In August 2019 it was announced that Nanosemantics is going to participate in creation of open operating system for creating automated voice assistants. The project was called SOVA (Smart Open Virtual Assistant) and received investment of 300 million roubles (~$4,6 million) from Russian state-maintained National Technological Initiative.

The company maintains long-term partnerships with Skolkovo Innovation Center (resident of IT cluster), branch association "Neuronet" and Yandex.

Together with USA-based startup Remedy Logic, Nanosemantics has developed a medical diagnostic system for finding, using AI, spinal pathologies in tomography images of human bodies. Among them: central, foraminal and lateral lumbar stenosis, hernias, arthrosis. The system offers options of treatment.

Since August 2021 the company is the resident of Technology Valley of Moscow State University.

Also in 2021, Nanosemantics became a member of Committee on Artificial Intelligence within the Russian Association of Software Developers "Native Soft".

The company states as one of its missions support of initiatives aimed at preservation and development of the Russian language. In May 2021, together with Pushkin Institute, the company created a chat bot called Phil, that explains to Russian people meaning of different Russian neologisms, and offers synonyms for them. Bot's vocabulary contains more than 500 neologisms, as well the bot can give advice on jargonisms and other types of specific words.

Also in 2021, Nanosemanics Lab has signed the first-ever Russian "Codex of ethics of artificial intelligence". It establishes guidelines for ethical behavior of businesses that implement AI-based solutions.

=== IT contests ===
The company regularly organizes All-Russian Turing Test competitions for IT developers. Some of these events are co-organized with Microsoft. During the competitions, judges randomly choose virtual interlocutor and have a short conversation with them. They have to determine if a human or a machine is talking to them. An interlocutor may be either a bot or its human creator or operator. The results are measured in per cent of judges that were successfully convinced by a machine that it was a human.

In 2021 Nanosemantics took part in federal project "Artificial Intelligence" by National Technological Initiative.

In December 2021 the company together with state enterprise "Resource Center of Universal Design and Rehabilitation Technologies" (RCUD-RT) held an all-Russian hackathon aimed at development of AI solutions for medicine. During 3 days, participants created several training programs for patients with speech disorders.

In April 2022, another hackathon by Nanosemantics was held together with MIREA – Russian Technological University. Students were participating and trying to generate algorithms for voice deepfakes. 17 teams contested in creation of software that generated artificial voice of a certain person.

== Recognition ==
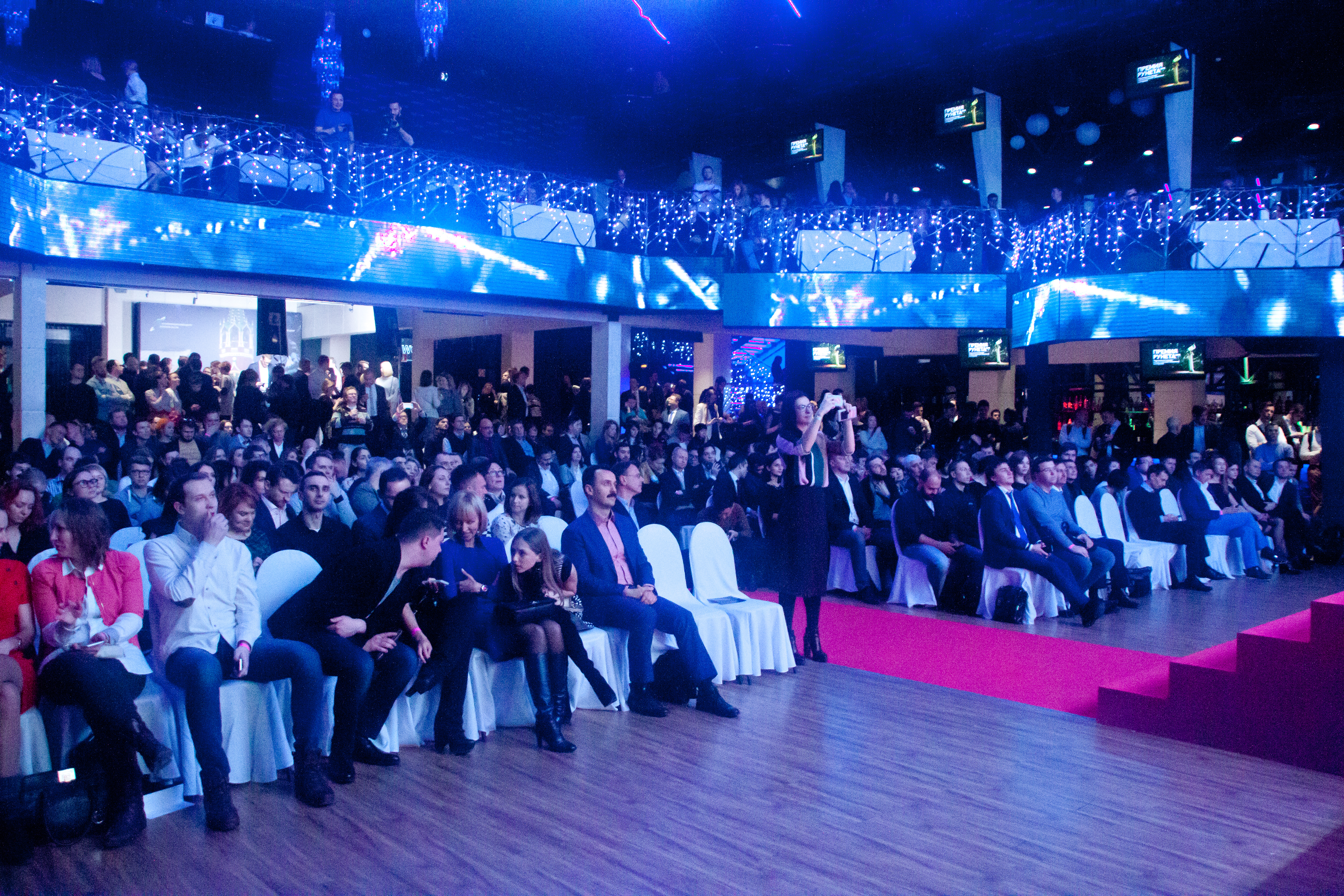
Runet Prize 2016

Since its foundation, Nanosemantics Lab has received a number of recognitions and awards. Among them are several professional ROTOR awards for the website iii.ru (created in 2009). The website gives the general public the means to create and train virtual assistants, which can then be used on a website or integrated into social networks.

In 2013, a virtual assistant called Dana, created for Beeline Kazakhstan, was awarded with professional prize "Crystal Headset" in nomination "the best applying of technology".

In 2015, the RBTH international media service included Nanosemantics in its list of "Top 50 Startups" in Russia.

In 2016, the company received Russian state-maintained award called Runet Prize in two nominations: "State and Society" and "Technology and Innovation".

In 2021, in Velikiy Novgorod, Nanosemantics team has won a hackathon aimed at finding means of discovering corruption schemes in Russian laws.

In February 2022 the company won another contest by National Technological Initiative, called "Prochtenie", aimed at creation of AI systems for checking schoolchildren's school essays. The Nanosemantics team was awarded 20 million rubles for "overcoming technological barrier" in contest dedicated to English language, and 12 million for 1st place in special nomination "Structure" in Russian-language essay contest.
