= Starikov =

Starikov (Russian: Ста́риков) (feminine: Starikova) is a Russian surname. Notable people with the surname include:

- Filipp Starikov (1896–1980), Soviet military commander
- Nikolai Starikov (born 1970), Russian writer and journalist
- Olena Starikova (born 1996), Ukrainian track cyclist
- Sergei Starikov (born 1958), Russian ice hockey player and coach
- Yevgeni Starikov (born 1988), American footballer
