= Dima Barbanel =

Russian designer

- Дмитрий Евгеньевич Барбанель
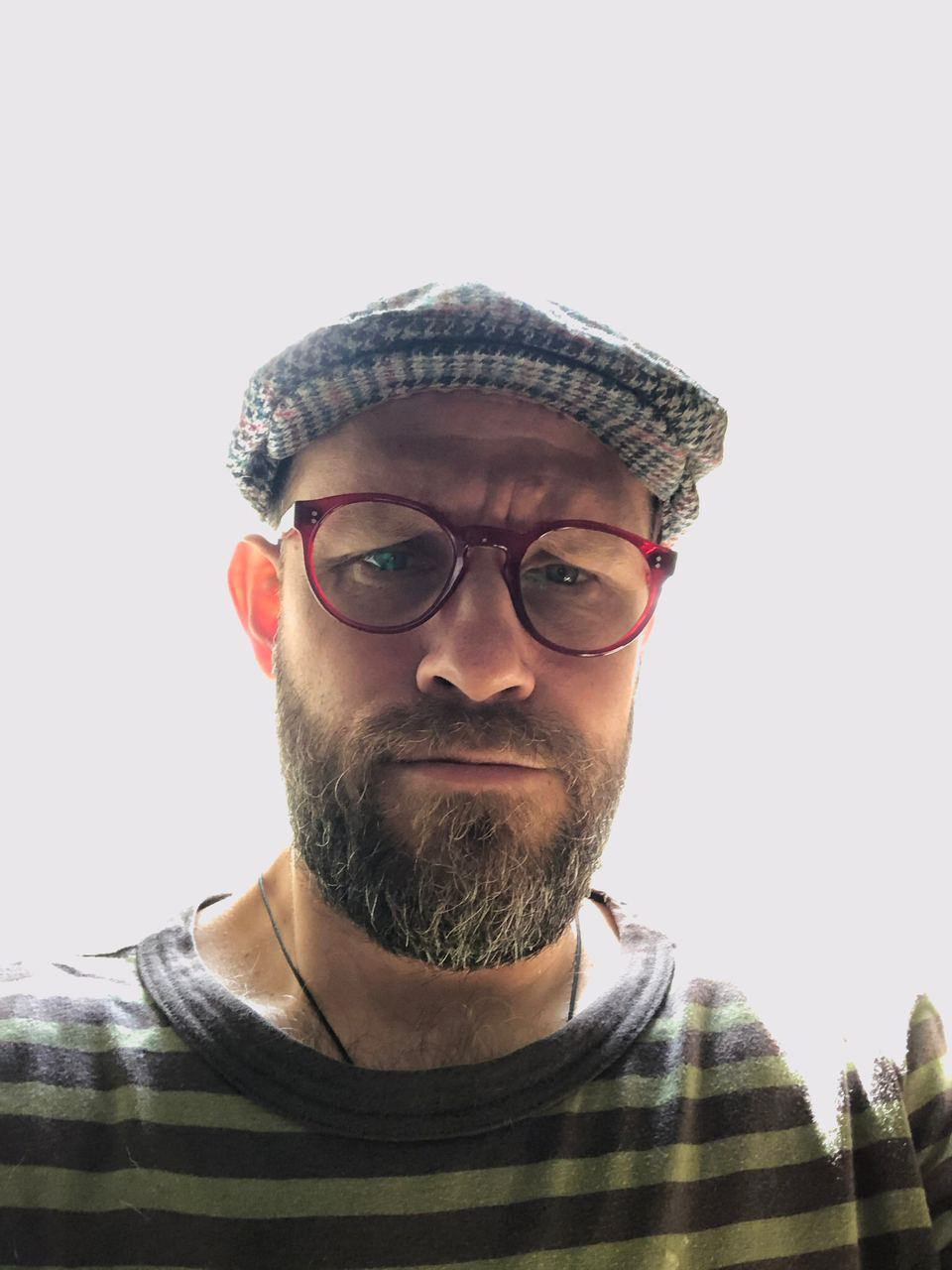
- Born: August 16, 1973 (age 51); Leningrad, USSR
- Education: Saint Petersburg Stieglitz State Academy of Art and Design, Fabrica research centre
- Occupation(s): designer, art director
- Years active: 1999–present
- Website: dimabarbanel.com

Dima Barbanel (born August 16, 1973, in Leningrad, USSR) is a Russian designer and art director, the head of the Masterskaya multidisciplinary team, Campus and DesignWorkout education projects.

Barbanel became known as the art director of the Russian editions of Esquire, Interni, Citizen K, The Art Newspaper, and Harper's Bazaar, as well as Vokrug sveta, The Firm's Secret, and Afisha magazines. With Masterskaya, he ran a number of notable projects, such as VDNKh rebranding.

In 2013, Barbanel launched the Campus educational project in the village of Fominskoye in the Moscow Region. The students (called co-workers) live on campus and work on real-world; projects with Barbanel and other experienced designers. The Campus aimed to encourage revolutionary thinking in design and implement the training practices Barbanel learned in the 1990s in the Fabrica research centre under the mentorship of Oliviero Toscani.
