= Great Fatherland Party =

Great Fatherland Party Партия Великое Отечество
- Abbreviation: PVO (English); ПВО (Russian)
- Leader: Andrey Zavyalov
- Founders: Nikolai Starikov; Igor Ashmanov
- Founded: April 12, 2013
- Dissolved: March 19, 2020
- Preceded by: Trade Union of Russian Citizens
- Merged into: For Truth
- Succeeded by: Russian Party of Socialism Today; Patriots of Great Fatherland
- Headquarters: 34th Building, Korablestroiteley Street, St. Petersburg, Russia. 199397
- Newspaper: Kontrudar (Counterattack)
- Youth wing: Youth Wing of PVO
- Membership (2016): 50,000
- Ideology: Conservatism; National conservatism Russian nationalism Centrism
- Political position: Centre-right to right-wing
- National affiliation: All-Russia People's Front
- Colours: Red
- Slogan: "For us, Russia is greater than the world!" (Russian: "Для нас Россия больше мира!")

Party flag

Website
- партиявеликоеотечество.рф

Great Fatherland Party (GFP or PVO; Russian: Партия Великое Отечество; ПВО; Partiya Velikoye Otechestvo, PVO) is a Russian political party founded on 12 April 2013. The party leader and one of its founders is the writer and publicist Nikolai Starikov.

In 2016, the Party of the Great Fatherland declared its intention to participate in the elections for Russian regional parliaments, contesting seats in St. Petersburg, Leningrad Oblast, Kaliningrad Oblast, Perm Krai, and Republic of Mordovia.

The Russian abbreviation for the party name is ПВО (PVO), which also stands for anti-aircraft warfare (Russian: Противовоздушная оборона), so the party uses this fact for explanation of its goals: the party protects Russia as does anti-aircraft warfare and neither can be used for aggression.

In March 2020, the party was liquidated by a decision of the Supreme Court of Russia.

== History ==
In April 2012 Nikolai Starikov together with Igor Ashmanov, the founder of IT-company "Ashmanov & Partners", created the party "New Great Russia". On April 12, 2013 the Ministry of Justice of Russia registered the party under the name "Great Fatherland Party". The change in name was because the Ministry of Justice judged it to be too similar to the names of already registered parties and refused to register it.

=== Participation in regional and local elections ===
In 2014, the party filed an application to participate in the elections to the State Council of Crimea, but was refused registration in connection with failure to provide required documents.

As stated on the official website, as of June 1, 2016 representatives of the party won in two local elections and head of the local Executive authorities in the village of Energetik (Orenburg Oblast) and the settlement of Znamensk (Kaliningrad Oblast).

In the municipal elections in St. Petersburg in 2014, the party won 7 seats.

=== Participation in federal elections ===
In 2016, the Great Fatherland Party had intended to take part in the elections to the State Duma. However, on 12 August 2016 the Central Election Commission refused to register the party list in the elections to the State Duma on the basis of exceeding the percentage of invalid signatures. 8 September 2016 the Great Fatherland Party signed an agreement of collaboration with Rodina party.

== Leadership ==
=== Chairmen of the party ===
1. Nikolai Starikov (2013—2018)
2. Andrey Zavyalov (since 2018)

=== Current Presidium of the Central Committee ===
The Presidium of the Central Committee of the Party of the Great Fatherland:

- Andrey Zavyalov — Chairman
- Yevgeny Zlobin — Co-chair
- Andrey Karasyov — Co-chair
- Vladimir Obozny — Co-chair
- Pavel Chirkunov — Co-chair
