= Mamba (website) =

Network of websites

Mamba is a network of social discovery/social dating sites hosted/developed in Russia. It includes approximately 25,000 independent sites and dating sections on large portals and publishing sites (e.g. Yahoo, MSN, Icq, Mail.ru, Rambler.ru).

== History ==
The site was established in 2004, originally available only in Russia. In October 2004, the number of active users reached 1 million with over 7,000 daily sign-ups. By 2005, the site was reporting an estimated 4-5 million users, with the FINAM Investment Company purchasing a controlling interest in the company, as its service was rolled out to Ukraine, Belarus, Latvia, Lithuania, Estonia, Germany, the USA and Israel etc.

In 2006, the site strategy changed, with a new approach of consolidating its position in the market by process of partner acquisition and audience growth. According to the results in 2006’s half yearly report, the income was 80 million rubles. In January 2006, daily sign-ups had reached 38,000. Growth had increased by 24% compared to the previous year. By the end of 2006, the general number of profiles in the database had hit a reported approximate 8-9 million, 3.7 million of which were classed as 'active' (visiting the site at least once a month. At this time, an estimated 45-50 thousand users were ‘online’ at any given time, with 1.5 million users a day. In 2007 and 2008, the services were expanded to include extra features such as dating, diaries and gifts. The number of users hit a reported 9 million this year, with the income given as in excess of 300 million rubles. By 2008, the number of user profiles had hit 10 million users, with the site being used by around 10 million monthly, and the new mobile portal around 250,000 per month. At this time, daily users averaged 2 million, with around 60 thousand users online at any given time. By November 2009, the user base had reached 11.5 million people. Daily about 2 million unique users were visiting the site, with more than 100 thousand users online at any time. In July 2011, the structure of the site was changed: all registrations needed to be confirmed via mobile phone number. This helped to reduce spam, but also saw a reduction in site traffic.

=== Rebranding as Wamba ===
In July 2012, Mamba changed its name to Wamba in order to keep expanding into new markets with a unified name. In many countries the domain “mamba” was already taken by Storck, a producer of chewy sweets, so “Mamba” had to create a new brand for the international market.

In Russia, Mamba and Wamba operate alongside one another. After the rebranding, the old site works “like a partner” of Wamba system.

Before July 2012, Mamba was operating internationally as an independent project called Mamboo. Now Mamboo.com is part of Wamba system as well. The service can also be accessed through other domains belonging to partner dating sites as a white-label service.

== Features ==
The site is more image-orientated than CIS leading social networking sites Vkontakte and Odnoklassniki, to which it has been compared. For free, the user is able to create a profile with unlimited photo upload, instant messaging service, photo-rating and an interactive diary. Paid VIP status gives access to extra features.

== Funding ==
70% of the company is held by the investment company Finam, the other 30% belongs to Digital Sky Technologies (DST) (Mail.ru Group).
