= Nikolay Kononov =

Russian journalist and writer

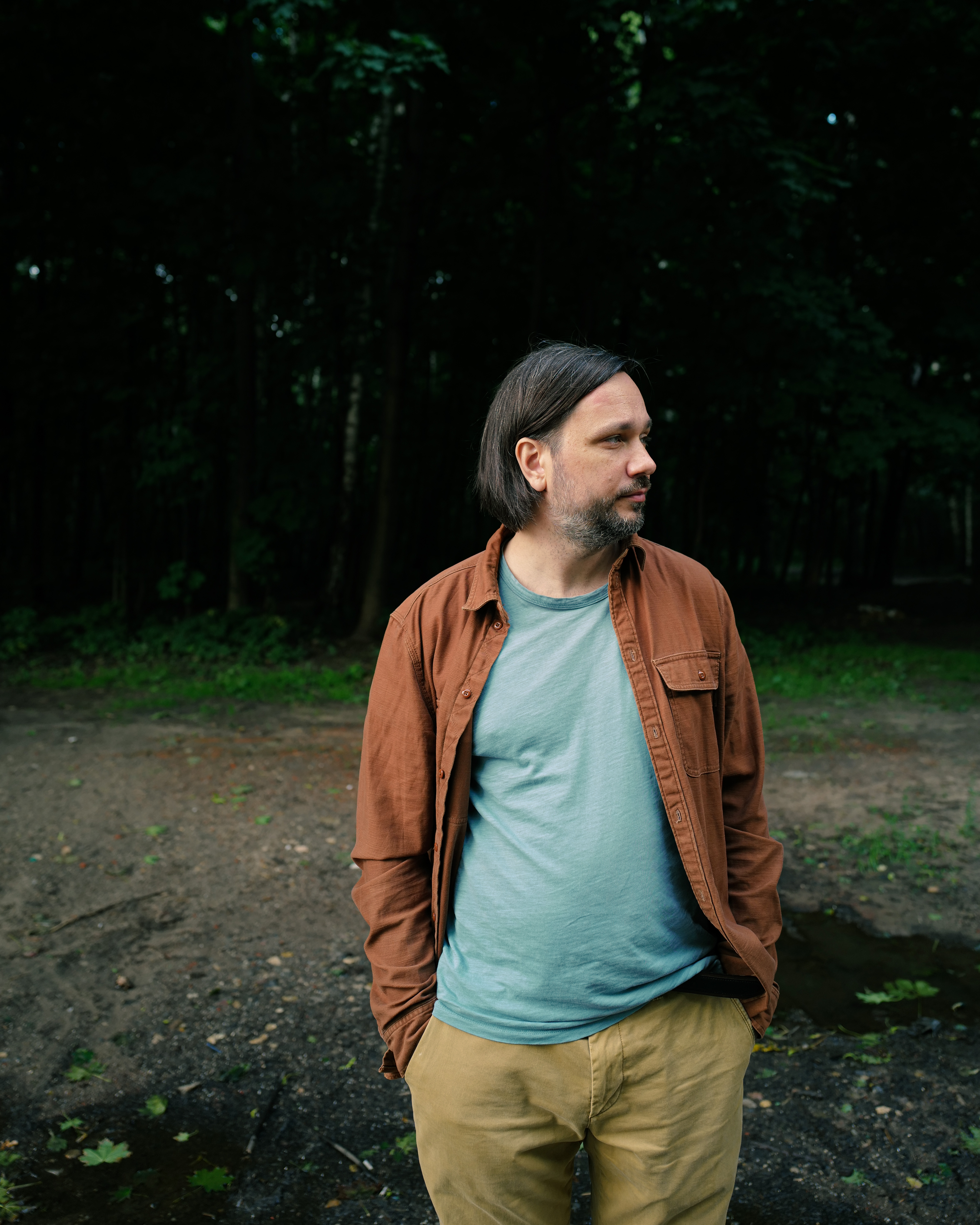
- Kononov in 2021
- Born: August 24, 1980 (age 46); Moscow, USSR
- Education: Moscow State University
- Occupations: writer, journalist

Nikolay Kononov (Russian: Никола́й Ви́кторович Ко́нонов, 24 August 1980, Moscow) is a Russian writer and journalist. He served as editor-in-chief of The Firm's Secret (2014–2017) and its editorial director until 2018. He is the author of four books: Deux Sine Machina: Stories of 20 crazy persons who made business in Russia from scratch (2011), Durov's Code. The real story of the social network "VKontakte" and its Creator (2012), The Uprising (2019), and The Night We Disappeared (2022).

== Biography ==
=== Media career ===
Nikolay Kononov graduated in 2002 from the Faculty of Journalism at Moscow State University, specializing in literary and art criticism. He also studied political philosophy in a joint program of Shaninka and the University of Manchester.

He began his journalism career with newspapers Izvestia and Stolichnaya Vechernyaya, then served as a senior reporter of Expert (2004–2005). In 2005, Kononov joined Forbes Russia as a columnist and editor. Between 2010 and 2011, he worked as a senior editor at Slon.ru, and later returned to Forbes to launch its digital platform, Forbes.ru. His reporting included profiles of outstanding entrepreneurs and investigative journalism, covering topics such as oligarchs' ties to the Kremlin, coal mine explosions in Kuzbass, the future of Siberia's oil industry, etc.

From 2012 to 2015, Kononov was editor-in-chief of Hopes&Fears, a daily online publication focused on young entrepreneurs. After its merger with The Village, he became editorial director at Look At Media. In 2013, he published a op-ed titled "The Shiver" in Seans magazine, addressing Moscow's anti-Putin protests. In 2014, he also taught writing workshops.

In 2015, Kononov joined The Firm's Secret as editor-in-chief along with several former colleagues from Hopes&Fears. His departure from Look At Media was influenced by management decisions, including merging Hopes&Fears with The Village and closing popular business projects that had attracted 800,000 monthly unique visitors. By 2017, financial difficulties led to staff cuts at The Firm's Secret, though Kononov remained as editorial director until late 2018, after which he pursued independent projects and teaching journalism and literature.

In 2019, Kononov relocated to Berlin with his family, where he pursued writing full-time. From 2022 until autumn 2023, he served as editor-in-chief of Teplitsa Social Technologies (Greenhouse of Social Technologies), expanding its coverage to political and art activism. In April 2023, the NGO was designated a foreign agent by Russian authorities, listing Kononov among affiliated individuals.

Kononov has contributed to The New York Times, Colta.ru, Republic.ru, Quartz, and written about the Russo-Ukrainian war for Neue Zürcher Zeitung and Le Temps. He headed the Trigger project at Deutsche Welle's Russian Service, analyzing global political trends, and lectured at Jan Michalski Foundation and the literary project Order of Words.

=== Literary career ===
Nikolay Kononov published his first short story, Specificus and Dieffenbach, in 2003 under the pseudonym Grigory Mikhailov, appearing in the almanac Babylon. His second story, Islands, Dreams, opened the March 2009 issue of Text Only literary magazine.

In 2011, he published his first book Deux Sine Machina: The Stories of 20 Crazy persons who Built Business from Scratch in Russia. The following year, he published Durov’s Code. The Real Story of the Social Network VKontakte and Its Creator. In March 2014, the New York Times featured Kononov's op-ed reviewing the developments surrounding Pavel Durov and his social network VKontakte.

Film adaptation rights to Durov’s Code were acquired by Alexander Rodnyansky's AR Films in 2012, but the initially planned 2014 premiere was postponed. In 2021, Non-Stop Production and Okko announced plans to adapt the book.

In 2017, Kononov published his third book, Author, Scissors, Paper: How to Write Impressive Texts Quickly. 14 Lessons, a practical guide on writing techniques, primarily for novice journalists. In 2021, he released I am Editor: A Desk Book for Everyone Working in Media, a manual for online media editors.

Kononov's debut novel, The Uprising was published in 2019. It's based on personal and archival documents, exploring the 1953 prisoner revolt at the Norilsk labor camp and the role played by Sergei Solovyov. The Uprising as later translated into French and published in Switzerland (La Révolte).

His second novel, The Night We Disappeared, was published in 2022 by Individuum. The story delves into the experiences of displaced people during World War II and the fate of stateless individuals. Although Kononov mentioned that he had written the book long before the Russian invasion of Ukraine, the publisher faced threats and criticism due to Kononov's political positions.

In 2025, Kononov's short story The Fugitive appeared in an anti-war anthology Nein! published by the Hamburg-based Rowohlt Verlag.

== Awards ==
Journalism awards

- 2017 — independent journalist award Redkollegia for a best story in Russian for multimedia longread Archipelago FSIN: How does Russian prison system work.
- 2014 — Piatigorsky Philosophical Prize, nomination.
- 2015 — "Journalist of the Year" in the GQ Man of the Year 2015 award
- 2015 — PwC media rating among the best in the "Online Media" category.
- 2022 — scholarship from the Berlin Senate Department of Culture as a foreign author.

Literary awards

- 2012 — NOS Award, shortlist, Deux Sine Machina: The Stories of 20 Crazy Persons Who Made Business in Russia From Scratch.
- 2013 — the Runet Prize, shortlist, The Durov's Code
- 2020 — NOS Award, shortlist, The Uprising

At various times, his works have been longlisted for awards such as the National Bestseller (2014, 2019), Yasnaya Polyana (2019), Big Book (2019), and NOS (2014).

== Books ==
- Kononov, Nikolay V. (2011). Бог без машины: Истории 20 сумасшедших, сделавших в России бизнес с нуля [Deux Sine Machina: The Stories of 20 Crazy persons Who Made Business in Russia From Scratch] (in Russian). Moscow: Alpina Business Books. p. 231. ISBN 978-5-904522-96-4.
- Kononov, Nikolay V. (2012). Код Дурова. Реальная история соцсети "ВКонтакте" и её создателя [Durov’s Code. The Real Story of the Social Network "VKontakte" and its Creator] (in Russian). Moscow: Mann, Ivanov and Ferber. pp. 208. ISBN 978-5-91657-546-0.
- Kononov, Nikolay V. (2017). Автор, ножницы, бумага. Как быстро писать впечатляющие тексты. 14 уроков [Author, scissors, paper. How to write impressive texts quickly. 14 lessons] (in Russian). Moscow: Mann, Ivanov and Ferber. p. 272. ISBN 978-5-00100-651-0.
- Kononov, Nikolay V. (2019). Восстание. Документальный роман [The Uprising. Documentary novel] (in Russian). Moscow: New Publishing House. p. 310. ISBN 978-5-98379-233-3.
- Kononov, Nikolay V. (2022). Ночь, когда мы исчезли [The Night We Disappeared] (in Russian). Moscow: Individuum Books. p. 432. ISBN 978-5-6048006-4-5.
