= Igor Ashmanov =

Russian mathematician, computer scientist and entrepreneur (born 1962)

- Игорь Ашманов
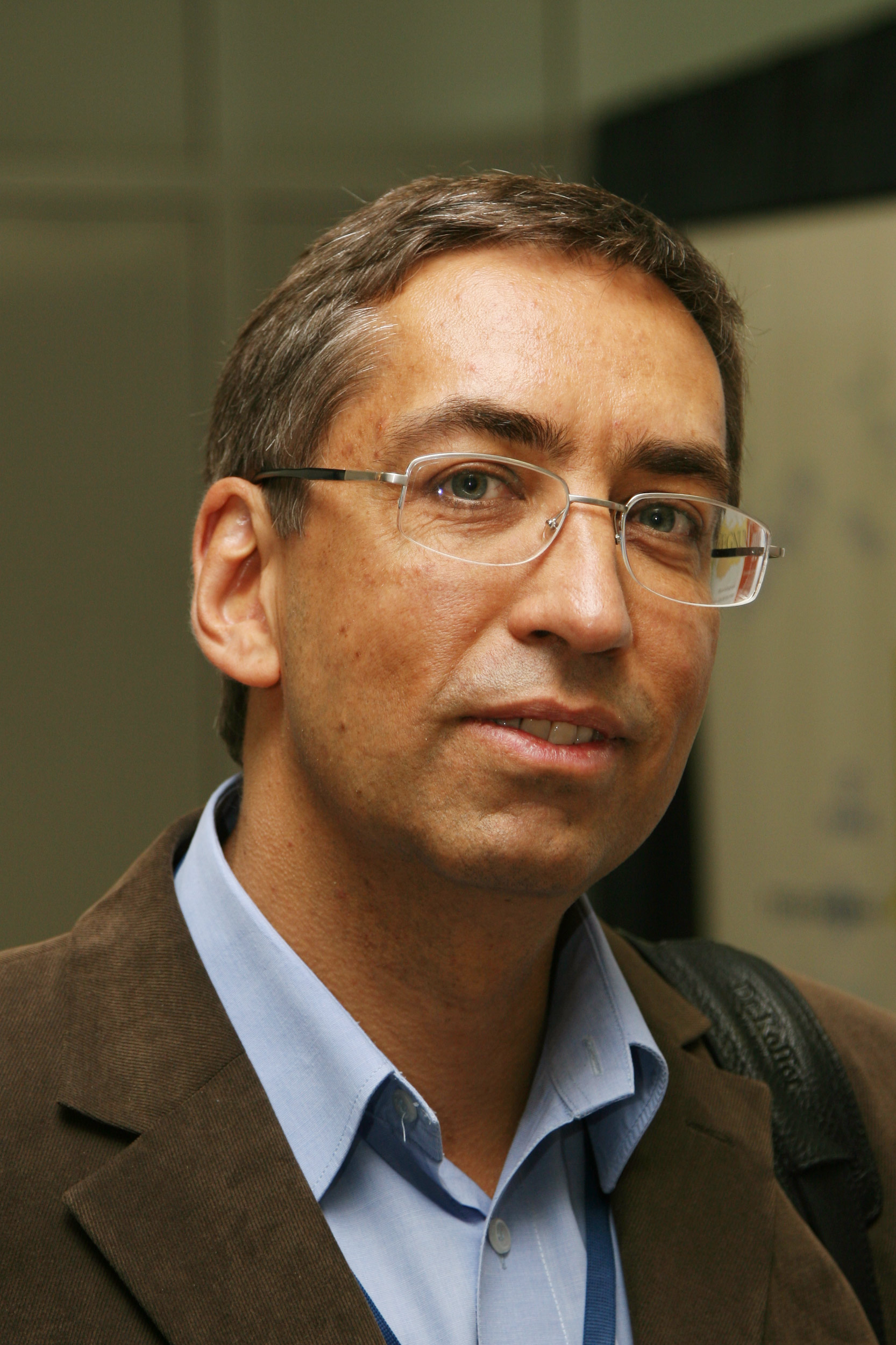
- Ashmanov in 2008
- Born: 9 January 1962 (age 64); Moscow, Russian SFSR, Soviet Union
- Occupation: IT entrepreneur
- Known for: COO of Rambler, Founder of Ashmanov & Partners
- Spouse: Natalya Kaspersky (m. 2001)
- Children: 3

Igor Stanislаvovich Ashmаnov (Russian: Игорь Станиславович Ашманов; born 9 January 1962) is a Russian entrepreneur and politician specializing in information technology, artificial intelligence, software development, project management. He directed development of the linguistic module ORFO of the Russian edition of Microsoft Office, a family of Multilex electronic dictionaries, Spamtest spam filter etc.

Managing partner of Ashmanov & Partners, investor and co-owner of dozens of IT start-ups, one of the founders and top managers of the Russian IT industry.

== Early years ==
Born in Moscow on 9 January 1962 in a family of mathematicians, including his father Stanislav Ashmanov.

Father, Stanislav Alexandrovich Ashmanov (1941—1994), was a post-graduate student at Moscow State University, later to become Doctor of Physical and Mathematical Sciences and professor at MSU Faculty of Computational Mathematics and Cybernetics, one of the leading Russian scientists in the field of mathematical economy and author of over 60 papers on mathematical optimization and linear programming. Both his mother, Natalya Alexandrovna Berezina, and his grandmother were graduates of the MSU Faculty of Mechanics and Mathematics.

== Education ==
Studied at MSU Faculty of Mechanics and Mathematics where he specialized in abstract algebra. Graduated from the university in 1983, with a graduation thesis On aspheric co-presentations of free groups and a problem by Philip Hall.

In 1985—1987, post-graduate student at the abstract algebra department at MSU Faculty of Mechanics and Mathematics. In 1995, he defended a thesis, Architecture and industrial implementation of applied linguistic systems, based on descriptions of architecture and algorithms of ORFO, and became a Doctor of Science.

In 2000—2001, he completed the MBA. Strategic management course in Higher School of International Business at Russian Presidential Academy of National Economy and Public Administration.

== Career ==
=== Dorodnitsyn Computing Centre ===
Igor Ashmanov started his career in IT when he joined the artificial intelligence department of Dorodnitsyn Computing Centre as an intern researcher. In 1985, he became a research associate in the Centre. During the time, he developed a natural language based discussion system, economic computing etc.

=== Informatic ===
In 1987, he joined the ORFO spell checker developers team at Informatic, where he was responsible for the linguistic corpus. He also directed the development of the Context electronic dictionary, the Logos interlinear translation program, the Calligraph hyphenation system, the Sphinx full-text search engine, and the Jordan matrix calculator.

During the 1991 Soviet coup d'état attempt, most of ORFO developers, including the team leader, left Russia for the USA. Ashmanov chose to stay and headed the ORFO project.

In 1992, ORFO was licensed to IBM, and in 1994, Microsoft chose it to become part of the Russian edition of its flagship Microsoft Office product. In 1995, Microsoft acquired ORFO, and Ashmanov left Informatics.

=== MediaLingua ===
In 1995, Igor Ashmanov co-founded MediaLingua and became its CEO. The company acquired exclusive rights for electronic dictionaries by the Russian Language publishing house and created a MultiLex family of electronic bilingual dictionaries.

In 1999, Oleg Serebrennikov, the majority shareholder of MediaLingua, decided to change development strategy of the company, and Igor Ashmanov left the company to join Rambler as software research and development director.

=== Rambler ===
In 2001, Ashmanov became chief operating officer at Rambler. During his management time at the company, new search core Rambler 2.0 was developed and deployed, and over two dozens of new services of the web portal were launched.

Later, Igor Ashmanov had a book on his work in Rambler published. Life inside a bubble («Жизнь внутри пузыря») became a bestseller, lifting a curtain of a life inside a large internet holding company.

During his 1.5 years at Rambler, Ashmanov witnessed ownership rotation three times, while none of the new owners expressed any interest in developing the search engine. He left the company in May 2001.

=== A&P ===
Later in 2001, Ashmanov founded a consulting company Ashmanov & Partners that kickstarted the search engine optimization market in Russia and became its leader. He was joined by former colleagues from Rambler, who later became shareholders in the company.

"Ashmanov & Partners" and its subsidiaries currently employ over 300 people. As reported by The Firm's Secret magazine in 2011, Ashmanov & Partners serviced over 1,000 clients monthly and had a total market share of 5—10 % in Russian on-line marketing industry.

Apart from providing integrated on-line marketing services, A&P develops technologies for marketing professionals, organizes leading industry's conferences, and runs its On-line Marketing Academy, where experts from A&P and its rival companies educate students. Artificial Intelligence research in 2005 was organized as a subsidiary Nanosemantics.

In 2007, the annual gross volume of Ashmanov & Partners was estimated by Finam Holdings at USD $2.5 mln. According to annual web studios' rating by Factus, based on publicly available tax reports, gross volume of Ashmanov & Partners in 2015 was over ₽300 mln, VAT not included.

Ashmanov & Partners has a number of subsidiaries, both acquired and started by the company. The subsidiaries are not part of any formal corporate group, but they use resources by both Ashmanov & Partners and sibling companies.

== Accomplishments ==
=== Wealth ===
The Finance magazine twice estimated Ashmanov's wealth as $50 mln in 2010 and 2011.

In 2012, The Firm's Secret magazine estimated Ashmanov's wealth as $56 mln, downsizing it to $22 mln in 2014.

=== Ratings ===
Igor Ashmanov is winner of ROTOR's Man of the year nomination in 2004 and 2006, taking 2nd place in 2008.

Commonly takes 2nd place (after Artemy Lebedev) in Tagline advertising agency's Key persons in the Russian digital marketing and web development market rating of 2012, 2013, 2014, and 2015.

In 2011, Forbes Russia included Ashmanov into the TOP30 list of Russian Internet businessmen.

Igor Ashmanov is also among TOP100 Russian Internet millionaires according to The Firm's Secret magazine (35th in 2012, 84th in 2014).

== Public activity ==
Igor Ashmanov is active participant in multiple government working groups: a Presidential Executive Office based working group on digital economy (Internet + society and Internet + sovereignty subgroups, led by Igor Schyogolev), a State Duma-based Digital Economy Council (led by Vyacheslav Volodin), and the Ministry of Communications-based working group on digital economy (Information security subgroup).

He is also Skolkovo Foundation expert and lecturer at the Military Academy of Strategic Missile Troops and the Military Academy of the General Staff of the Armed Forces, where he delivers lectures on big data, social networks, and information warfare.

Since June 2012, he is co-chair in the Russian Great Fatherland Party.

== Personal life ==
Igor Ashmanov is of Eastern Orthodox Christian faith.

Second wife (since 2001) is Natalya Kaspersky, IT entrepreneur and first wife of Eugene Kaspersky. He has 3 children from the second marriage: Alexandra (2005), Maria (2009), Varvara (2012). The couple also brings up two sons, Maxim and Ivan, from Kaspersky's first marriage.
