= COMDI =

Online broadcasting software

- Developer: COMDI
- Operating system: Cross-platform software
- Type: Application for online broadcasting (Web conferencing and collaboration)
- License: Proprietary
- Website: www.comdi.com

COMDI is application software for online broadcasting. It was developed in Russia. An online service of the same name provides SaaS visitors with the opportunity to conduct online-meetings for an audience of up to 1500 people. The service is implemented on Flash technology and is available on any Flash-capable browser (version 10 and higher) and has integration tools (API). Broadcast servers sit in Russia.

COMDI is offered as a replicable software (under license) as well as an embedded component for websites, to provide additional services to visitors.

== History ==
The software launched on 1 September 2009.

In 2012, COMDI merged with Webinar.ru, an IT company specializing in the development and delivery of web and video conferencing services. After the merger, COMDI products began to be sold in Russia under Webinar.ru brand, in other countries, as well as in mobile applications, the trademark COMDI was still used.

== Functions ==
While the functionality includes elements of distance learning systems and video conferencing products, the focus is on tools for business communication necessary for conducting webinars:

1. direct voice / video broadcasting (1 moderator and up to 1500+ listeners)
2. voice / video conference (2-8 participants)
3. instant messaging (chat)
4. presentation of files of office formats with the whiteboard function (shared by the participants of the online meeting)
5. file sharing
6. screen sharing

== Awards ==
The service won the Runet Award 2010 in the Technology and Innovations category.
