= Moscow School of Management SKOLKOVO =

Russian graduate business school

Skolkovo Moscow School of Management Московская школа управления Сколково
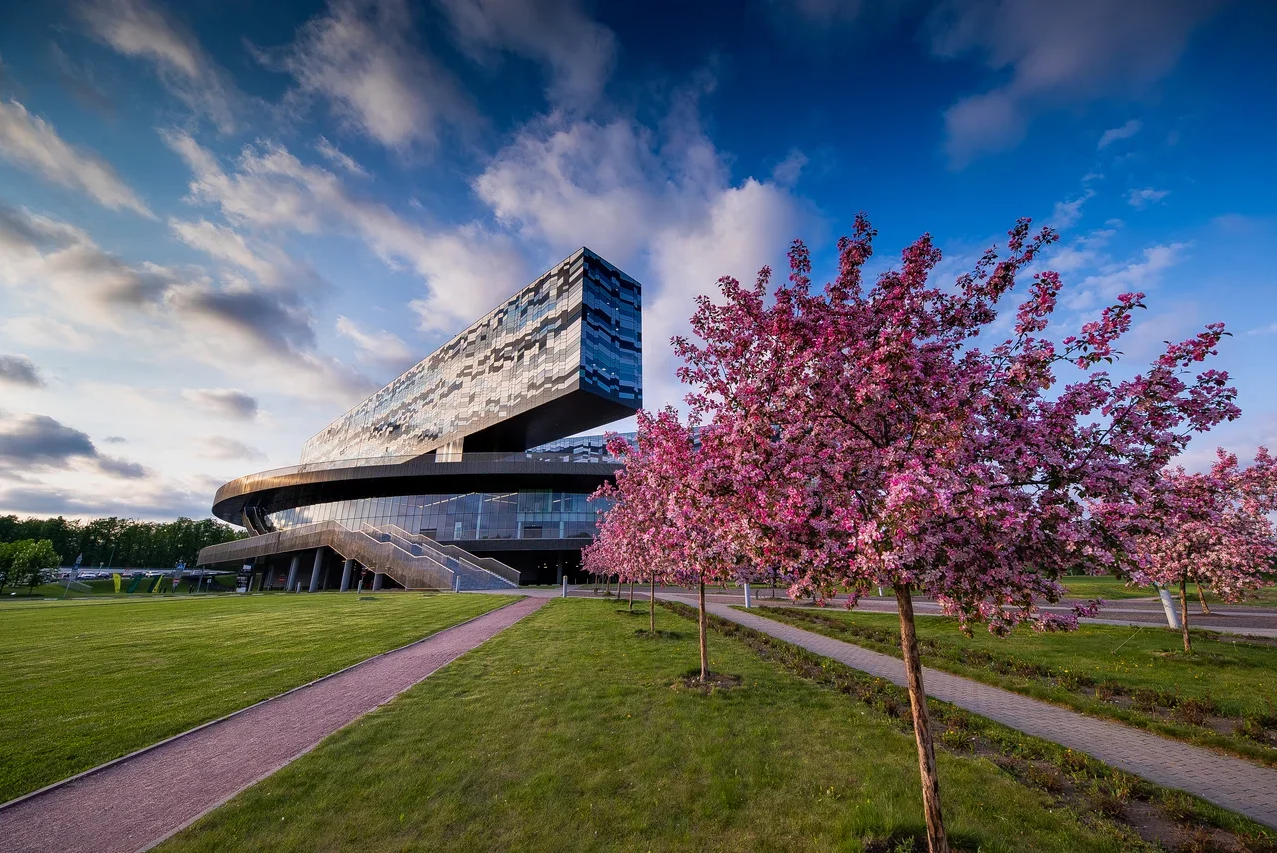
- Type: Business school
- Established: 2006; 20 years ago
- President: Andrei Sharonov
- Dean: Alexander Kim
- Location: Moscow, Moscow, Russia; 55°41′44″N 37°23′26″E
- Website: www.skolkovo.ru
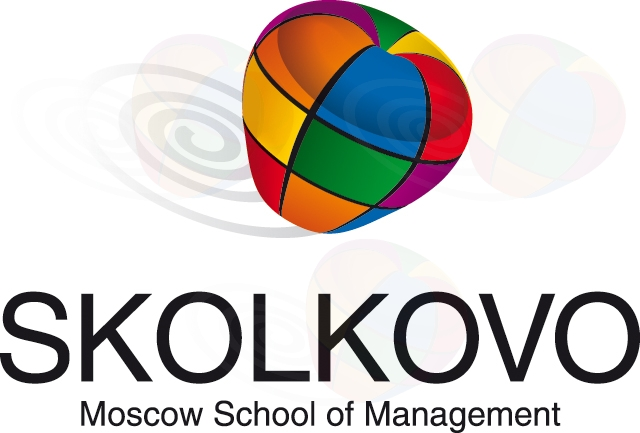

The Moscow School of Management SKOLKOVO is a graduate business school located near Skolkovo, Moscow Oblast, nearby to Moscow, Russia. The school, founded in 2006, is a joint project between Russian and international business leaders.

SKOLKOVO Business School is funded solely by its commercial activities and private investment.

One of the first SKOLKOVO International Advisory Board members was Lee Kuan Yew, the Minister Mentor of the Republic of Singapore.

== History ==
The groundbreaking ceremony was held on September 21, 2006. Corporate education programs launched the same year.

The first meeting of the SKOLKOVO International Advisory Board passed in 2007.

SKOLKOVO MBA and SKOLKOVO Executive MBA programs were launched in 2009. In 2010 SKOLKOVO Business School became a member of EFMD and UNICON. The SKOLKOVO Education Development Center was launched in 2011. The SKOLKOVO Startup Academy and the New Leaders of University Education program were added in 2012.

The Practicum for Directors, a program for the managers of small and mid-sized businesses was launched in 2013. The SKOLKOVO Wealth Management and Philanthropy Center opened that same year.

The First Annual Alumni Convention was held in 2014. The SKOLKOVO MBA program ranked first in Russia by The Secret of The Firm magazine.

The SKOLKOVO Sustainable Business Center for Expertise in sustainable development was launched in 2015. Experts of the Business School participated in Unknown Russia: Powered by Entrepreneurs report for the World Economic Forum in Davos.

In 2016, SKOLKOVO signed a three-year cooperation agreement with the School of Business and Management of Hong Kong University of Science and Technology (HKUST) for the collaborative development of educational programs, academic quality processes, research collaboration, and faculty/student exchanges. The SKOLKOVO MBA grant program, the largest among Russian private schools was launched. The launch of the SKOLKOVO Healthcare Development Centre followed the same year. The open enrollment program on Sustainable Strategies for business executives was conducted for the first time.

2017: EFMD Excellence in Practice Finalist in the special category “Ecosystem Development”. EFMD Case Writing Competition Winner in the Sustainable Production System Category.

2018: EFMD Excellence in Practice Gold Award in Special Category “Ecosystem Development”. Launch of HKUST-SKOLKOVO EMBA for Eurasia, LIFT (Leadership Identity Foundation and Transformation) jointly with IMD, MPS (Master of Public Strategy), Leaders as Teachers and Executive coaching programs

2022: The Global Network for Advanced Management (GNAM) announced the suspension of the Skolkovo School of Management from GNAM programming

== Campus ==
The concept and design of the campus were conceived by British architect David Adjaye as a reflection on the ideas of the artist Kazimir Malevich. The architectural project of the Skolkovo campus was presented in the Russian pavilion at the 11th Venice Biennale

Skolkovo campus represents a disk with four different-sized buildings located on its roof. The main building, also known as The Disk, features seven clusters named after the continents and BRIC countries. The Campus has 16 classrooms and 49 rooms for project and group work. Buildings on the roof are a dormitory, a hotel, an administrative building, and a sports center.

== Degree programmes ==
SKOLKOVO Business School offers two intakes of MBA programs per year, one intake of Executive MBA, starting each spring, and one EMBA for Eurasia – joint dual degree program with HKUST Business School (Hong Kong).

The MBA program is designed so that all the fundamental core courses are learnt in the first half of the programme (first 7-8 modules). The second half of the prprogramocuses more on the applicability of all the skills and knowledge in project work. The school annually holds a grants competition for MBA and half of the cohort consists of students who received scholarships.

The EMBA for Eurasia is international business education for managers and business owners developing their business in Eurasia, a 16-month dual-dprogramgramme developed jointly by HKUST Business School (one of the most prestigious business schools in Asia) and SKOLKOVO. program focuses on business in Eurasia within the framework of the Belt and Road Initiative. The program has modules in 7 countries: Russia (SKOLKOVO Business School), China (HKUST), Kazakhstan (Nazarbaev University), Armenia, Israel (Tel-Aviv University), Switzerland (University of St.Gallen) and USA (University of California, Berkeley).

== Entrepreneurial programs ==
SKOLKOVO helps SME teams and individual entrepreneurs to develop their management and business competencies as well as launch a real business project in Russia or abroad. SKOLKOVO Practicum is a five-module open course for entrepreneurs and managers/general directors of small- and medium-sized Russian businesses. In 2018 SKOLKOVO has launched a new programme Practicum Global Shift focusing on SMEs that are targeting expansion into international markets.

== Executive Education ==
Executive education programs focus on companies’ transformation and top-management teams’ education and development.

SKOLKOVO provides programs for the educational sector (management of Russian universities), regional governments, single-enterprise cities, etc. In 2017, the Institute for Public Strategy was launched to target expansion of the School's offering for the public sector – including management programs for such areas as healthcare, non-profit organizations, etc.

In 2016, the SKOLKOVO-Rosatom educational program won the EFMD Excellence in Practice Silver Award, resulting in a [business case | https://www.efmd.org/images/stories/efmd/EIP/2016/Rosatom-Skolkovo_Moscow_School_Managment-Exec-summary-EiP2016.pdf].

In 2019, Moscow School of Management SKOLKOVO is launching an international training programme for municipal officials to retrain public administration teams of Russia's 100 largest cities.

== Research ==
Skolkovo's research agenda focuses on global practices resulting in applied knowledge which has relevance and impact in the field. SKOLKOVO has 8 centers expertise conducting research in different areas:

- SKOLKOVO Institute for Emerging Market Studies
- SKOLKOVO Executive Coaching, Career and Development Centre
- SKOLKOVO Energy Centre
- SKOLKOVO Education Development Centre
- SKOLKOVO Wealth Transformation Centre
- SKOLKOVO Healthcare Development Centre
- SKOLKOVO Centre for Digital Transformation
- SKOLKOVO Financial Innovations and Cashless Economy Centre
- SKOLKOVO Consumer market development center

== People ==
The Skolkovo Founders are 20 Russian and international individuals and businesses. The founding individuals include Alexander Abramov, Roman Abramovich, and Ruben Vardanian in and Sir David Adjaye OM OBE a practical partnership that extends beyond financial contribution to build on the cumulative 200 years of management experience.

== Notable alumni ==
Key figures of the SKOLKOVO Alumni community

- 74% men
- 26% women

== See also ==
- National Technological Initiative
- EFMD Quality Improvement System (EQUIS)
- Association to Advance Collegiate Schools of Business (AACSB)
- European Foundation for Management Development (EFMD)
