= Victor Remsha =

Russian businessman (born 1970)

Victor Mikhailovich Remsha
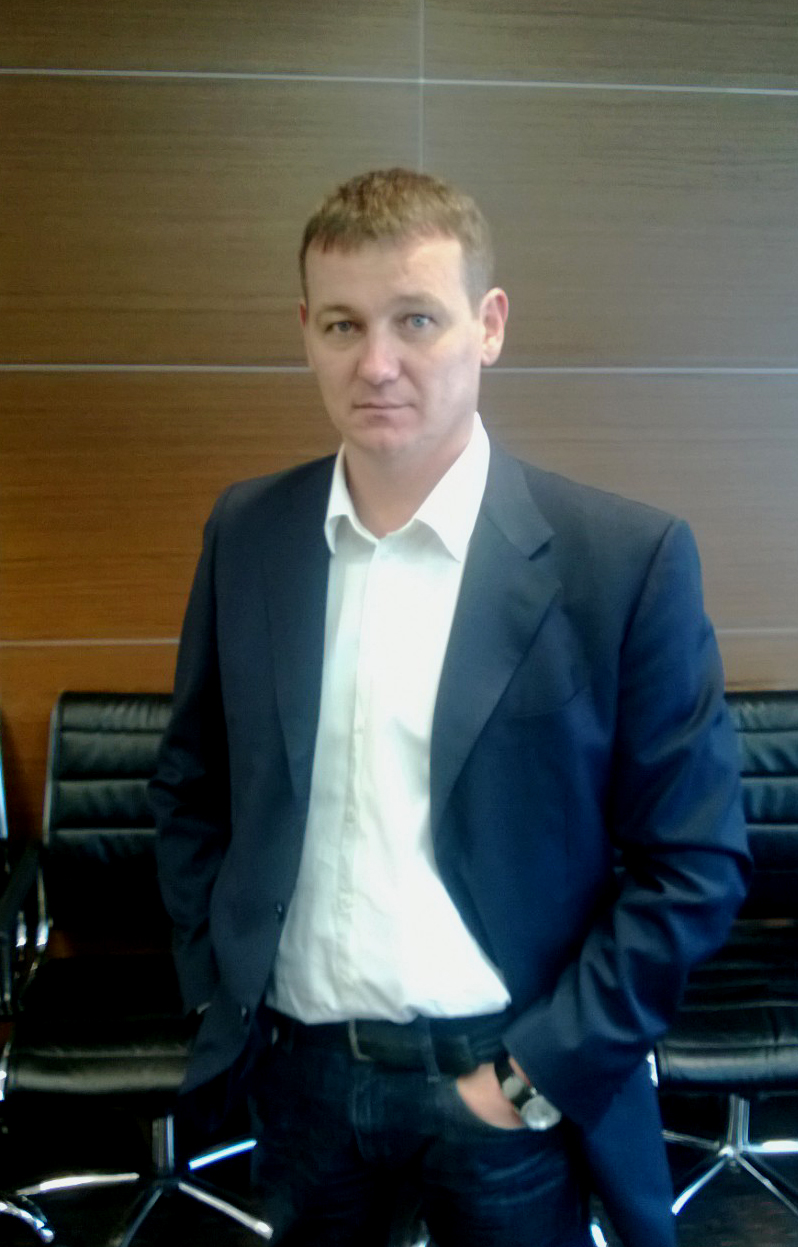
- Victor Remsha (2013)
- Born: Victor Mikhailovich Remsha; October 19, 1970 (age 55); Krasnoyarsk, Soviet Union
- Citizenship: Russian
- Education: Bauman Moscow State Technical University
- Occupation: Founder at Finam Investment Holding
- Spouse: Married
- Children: five
- Website: finam.ru

Victor Mikhailovich Remsha (Russian: Виктор Михайлович Ремша) is a Russian businessman who is the founder of Finam Investment Holding, a large Russian investment corporation. He is also on the boards of NAUFOR and MICEX-RTS.

Finam Investment Holding consists of CJSC Finam Investment Company, LLC Finam Management, the investment fund Finam Global, the international brokerage firm WhoTrades Ltd., CJSC Bank Finam, Finam Training Center, and the news agency Finam.ru along with other divisions. Altogether Finam is one of the biggest and most diversified investment financial groups in Russia.

== Early life and education ==
Viktor Remsha was born in Krasnoyarsk, and spent his school years in western Belarus. He then lived in Leningrad, and later moved to Moscow. Remsha became involved in finance in 1993 at Bauman Moscow State Technical University when the Russian securities market was still in its infancy.

== Career ==
Remsha decided in 1994 to provide stock market investors with real-time and accurate information on issuers, stock quotes and urgent stock market news. Finance-Analytic began to issue a daily bulletin, The Investor’s Portfolio, which individual investors used to decide when to execute transactions.

By the end of the 1990s Remsha's business interests were focused on brokerage services. Finance-Analytic obtained a license from the Federal Securities Commission and gained membership in NAUFOR, the Moscow Stock Exchange, MICEX and RTS. Later the ticker that was assigned to Finance-Analytic in the trading system operated by RTS. FINAM, the acrynymn deriving from "Finance-Analytic" and the letter "M" standing for Moscow, became the name of the investment holding. The company was one of the first in Russia to serve retail investors en masse and roll out online trading services, a move that helped the company evolve into a leader on the Russian securities market.

In 2002 Remsha reorganized Finance-Analytic into Finam Investment Holding, which comprises Finance-Analytic Investment Company, Finam News Group, Finance-Analytic Terra Investment Company, and the trade communications and insurance broker Finam Insurance. In a year's time all of the holding's divisions were united under the single Finam brand.

In 2002 Remsha set up a new division at Finam Investment Holding, the management company Finam Management, in order to enter the asset management business. Presently the company manages the assets of institutional investors and households along with the reserves accumulated by private pension funds, and mutual funds.

In 2004 Remsha bought Megawatt-Bank, JSC. Megawatt-Bank went through rebranding in 2006 and was renamed CJSC Finam Investment Bank.

=== Investments ===
==== Internet ====
Beginning in the 2000s Remsha made major investments in IT projects. He acquired 80% of the context ad firm Begun owned by Andrei Andreev (Ogandzhanyants). He purchased the dating site Mamba from in 2005. In subsequent years, Remsha, directly and through the funds he controlled, purchased equity stakes in over 60 IT firms, including Ashmanov & Partners (the leader of the Russian online marketing market), Badoo (another dating site), E-generator (an interactive agency specialized in creative ad development), Creditcardsonline (white offers details on credit cards and the opportunity to directly apply for bank cards), MGID (a content recommendation platform), Marketgid (which offers users a virtual entertainment and retail center), Delta Telecom (a payment system enabling payments to be accepted on behalf of over 600 operators and providers in Russia), Banki.ru (Russia's largest bank-focused website) and many others.

Finam also launched Comon, a social network for neophyte investors. In 2012 it merged with WhoTrades, a social network for international traders, which was founded by Remsha in New York in 2010

==== Media ====
In August 2007 Remsha completed the acquisition of the Bolshoye Radio station, which was later renamed Finam FM. Presently, Finam FM is a radio station covering Moscow and the Moscow region, broadcasting in the 99.6 FM frequency. Finam FM offers daily signature programs with pundits concerning the topics of business, science and culture. The radio station's musical content mainly includes Western classic rock music from the 1960—80s. In addition, Victor Remsha invested in Germany's Deluxe Television (a musical TV channel for adults).

==== Aircraft business ====
In the second half of the 2000s Remsha bought Bolshoye Gryzlovo, an airfield in the Serpukhov district of the Moscow region.
