= National Technological Initiative =

The National Technological Initiative (NTI) (Russian: Национальная технологическая инициатива (НТИ)) is a 2014 program created by Vladimir Putin with the purpose of creating Russian global technical leadership in Russia. It is a $2.1 trillion “road map” for development of the cybernetics market until 2035.

== Programs ==
- AeroNet pilotless aviation systems are widely used in agriculture, cargo transportation, and during search and rescue operations. The new flying taxi is called SerVert SV5B created by Russia's aviation startup, Aviaton.
- AvtoNet long-haul ground transportation using robotized road corridors
- MariNet digital navigation, pilotless sea vessels, and exploration of ocean resources.
- NeuroNet men will communicative with machines by neural interface.

Other goals

- Developing a Russian computer programming language, secure cybernetic communications, quantum computing, and teleportation.
- 5G mobile network in a number of Russian regions and allow data transfers of up to one gigabit per second.

== See also ==
- Skolkovo Innovation Center
- Skolkovo Moscow School of Management
- Skolkovo, Moscow Oblast - Russian Silicon Valley project location
