= Natalya Kaspersky =

Russian IT entrepreneur (born 1966)

- Наталья Касперская
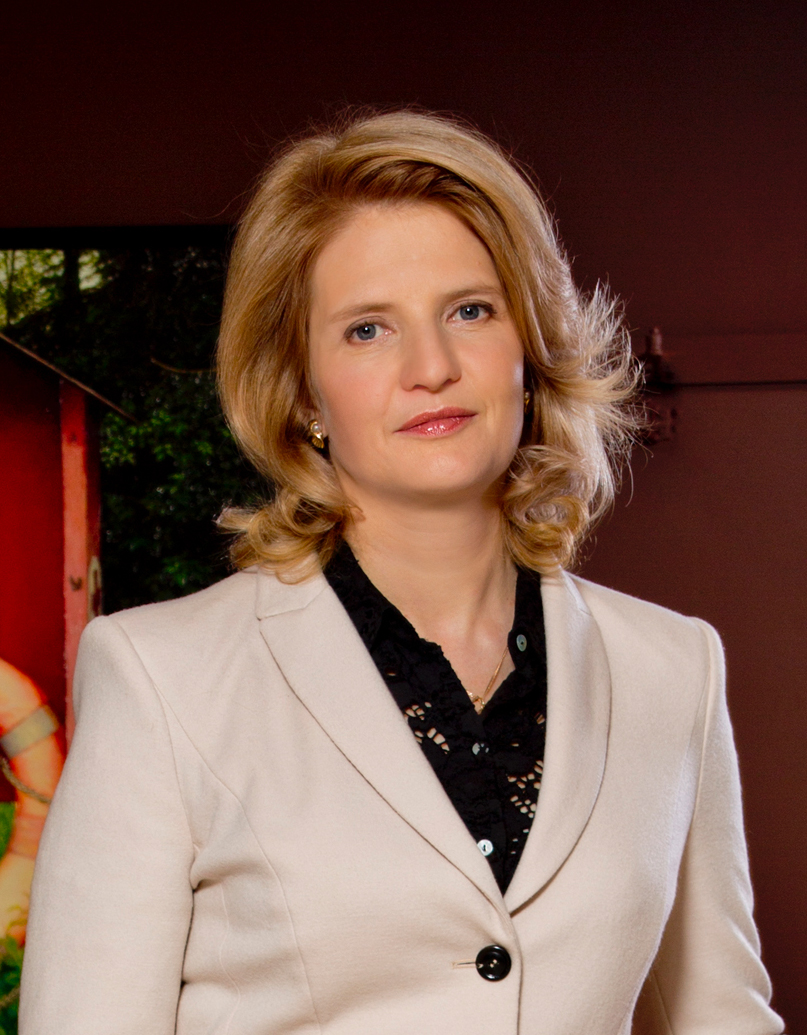
- Kaspersky in 2016
- Born: Natalya Ivanovna Stutser; 5 February 1966 (age 60); Moscow, Russian SFSR, Soviet Union
- Education: Moscow Institute of Electronic Machine Building (MIEM)
- Occupation: IT business executive
- Years active: 1994–present
- Known for: President of InfoWatch, Founder of Kaspersky Lab
- Spouses: Eugene Kaspersky (m. 1986; div. 1998) Igor Ashmanov (m. 2001)
- Children: 5

Natalya Ivanovna Kasperskaya (Russian: Наталья Ивановна Касперская, née Stutser (Штуцер); born 5 February 1966), better known as Natalya Kaspersky, (Note: In the West, uses as her surname the masculine form Kaspersky.) is a Russian IT entrepreneur, President of the InfoWatch Group of companies and co-founder and former CEO of antivirus security software company Kaspersky Lab. In addition, she is one of the wealthiest women in Russia and one of the most influential figures in the Russian IT industry.

== Biography ==
=== Early years ===
Natalya Kaspersky (née Stutser) was born on 5 February 1966 in Moscow into a family of engineers and Soviet defense research institute employees.

Natalya was elected as a member of her school pioneer council, and later as a member of the district pioneer headquarters, and was also a Komsomol member and organizer. Alongside her main education, Natalya also played basketball in the Children's and Youth Sports School and seriously intended to become a veterinarian until giving up on the dream because of difficulties with studying chemistry.

In the eighth year of her education, Natalya moved from an ordinary secondary school to a physics-mathematical school run by the Moscow Aviation Institute.

=== Education ===
After finishing this school, Natalya took the entrance exams for the Lomonosov Moscow State University but was not enrolled, missing out by half a point. However, her results were good enough to gain entry into the Moscow Institute of Electronic Machine Building (MIEM), where she studied applied mathematics (1984-1989), and the topic of her diploma was a mathematical model of a nuclear reactor cooling system. Later, she earned a bachelor's degree from the Open University in the UK. During her studies at the MIEM, she met her first husband Eugene Kaspersky, whom she married in 1986.

=== Career ===
After graduating from the institute, Natalya was assigned to the Central Scientific and Construction Bureau in Moscow, where she worked for half a year as a research scientist before going on maternity leave. Natalya started her career in IT at the age of 28, when she took on a job, in January 1994, as a salesperson for a computer accessories and software firm with a 50-dollar monthly salary. The job was based in a newly opened store in the KAMI Information Technologies Center created by a former professor of Natalya's ex-husband, Eugene Kaspersky, from a Higher School of the KGB during the Soviet epoch. She believes that all personal data, such as search history, geolocation, contacts, correspondence, photo and video materials, should belong to the State.

==== Kaspersky Lab ====
In September 1994, Natalya became head of a distribution department of AntiViral Toolkit Pro (AVP), which had been under development by Eugene Kaspersky's team since 1991. Over two or three years, Natalya successfully built distribution channels and a technical support network and entered international markets, with sales growing rapidly from an initial $100–200 per month in 1994, to more than $130,000 after a year, over $600,000 in 1996 and more than $1 million in 1997. Revenue was divided between the team and the mother company until 1997, when the future founders of 'Kaspersky Lab' decided to start their own business.

Natalya launched the Kaspersky Lab foundation in June 1997, was key to the naming of the new company, and worked as CEO for more than 10 years. Shares in 'Kaspersky Lab' were initially split between Eugene Kaspersky (50%), his two teammate programmers Alexey De-Monderik and Vadim Bogdanov (20% each), and Natalya Kasperskaya (10%). In 1997, Kaspersky Lab sales started to double yearly, with turnover reaching around $7 million in 2001 and exceeding $67 million in 2006.

In August 2007, Natalya was unseated and suspended from her key management functions by Eugene Kaspersky due to the couple's divorce and the deepening ideological divide between the two. Eventually, Natalya agreed to stay on as Chairperson of the newly established board of 'Kaspersky Lab', before finally breaking all ties with the previously family driven business in 2011, with Kaspersky Lab buying out Natalya's stake in the company in 2007 and 2011 (around 30% of shares in 2007).

Under Natalya's supervision, Kaspersky Lab turned into a leading antivirus corporation with a network of regional offices worldwide. At the moment of the power change in 2007, annual sales revenue had reached $126 million, while the company had an estimated capitalization of over $1.3 billion and yearly revenue of $700 million by 2011, when Natalya sold her remaining stake and departed. After the change in management, the company's rate of growth dropped visibly, with global revenue growing by 40% in 2009, 13.7% in 2011, 3% in 2012, and 6% in 2013.

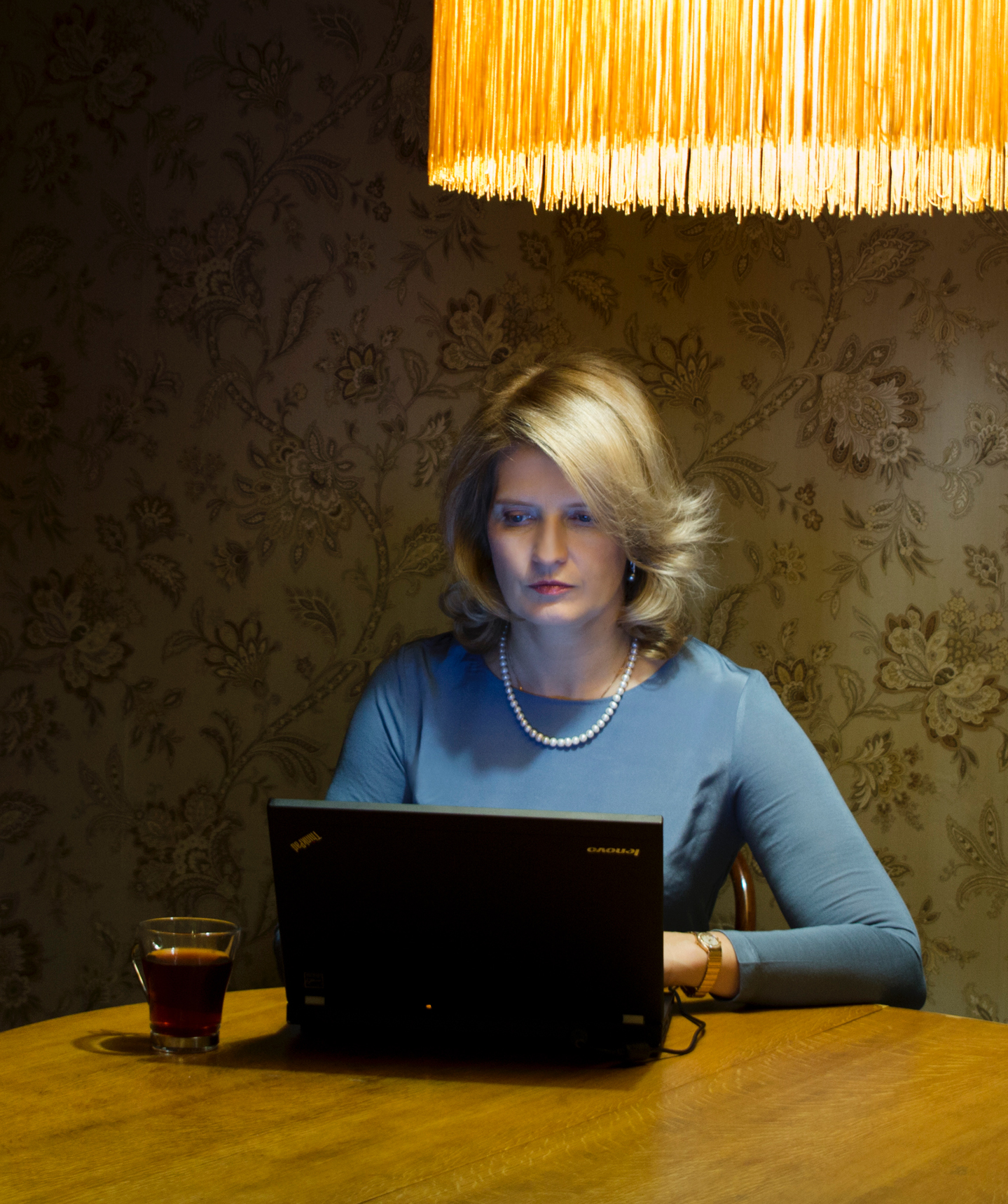
Natalya Kasperskaya (2016)

==== InfoWatch ====
After 'Kaspersky Lab' had bought the antispam technology developed by 'Ashmanov and Partners', the head of the latter, Igor Ashmanov, gave the buyer an idea to use the antispam engine backwards for protection against data leaks. During 2001–2002, 'Kaspersky Lab' programmers developed a solution which later became known as InfoWatch Traffic Monitor Enterprise and which offers protection for corporate users against internal threats (a DLP system). In December 2013, a subsidiary called 'InfoWatch' was established to develop and distribute new software.

Natalya Kasperskaya has been CEO and majority owner of 'InfoWatch' since October 2007, with her stake in the company being linked to the business separation deal with her ex-husband. Natalya made her main investments in 'InfoWatch', 'Kribrum' and 'Nanosemantics' co-owned by her and Igor Ashmanov, and 'G Data Software' AG, a German antivirus company.

'InfoWatch' software had only vague prospects at the time of the spin-off and was an albatross around 'Kaspersky Lab's neck. Unlike 'Kaspersky Lab', the technological solutions and product line of the new company were initially targeted at large and medium enterprises, starting from 300 workstations, rather than small businesses and retailers.

This required a fundamentally different skill set and approach, with Natalya's previous experience in management turning out not to be particularly relevant. Nevertheless, in 2012 InfoWatch, which was previously unprofitable, recorded its first earnings and went on growing at an annual rate of 60—70%. According to 'Forbes', InfoWatch annual revenue reached around $12 million in 2015, with independent experts polled by Russian daily newspaper 'Kommersant' in spring 2015 estimating the business to be worth $40–50 million.

As of 2015, InfoWatch is a group of companies working in two main business areas — corporate protection against internal threats and external targeted attacks — and holds nearly a 50% share of the Russian confidential data protection market (DLP systems). Its clients include Russian governmental organizations, as well as 'Sberbank', 'Beeline', 'Lukoil', 'Tatneft', 'Surgutneftegas', 'Sukhoi', 'Magnitogorsk Iron and Steel Works'. In addition, InfoWatch operates in the German, Middle East, and South-East Asian markets.

Current InfoWatch shareholders are Natalya Kasperskaya and the company's Deputy CEO Rustem Khairetdinov.

== Achievements ==
=== Private fortune ===
According to Forbes, Natalya Kasperskaya had a fortune of around $220 million in March 2013 – an estimate which increased to $230 million in 2014 and $270 million in 2015. In March 2015, Russian news portal 'Lenta.ru' agreed with Forbes’ 2014 estimation while, in July 2015, German magazine 'Der Spiegel' published an estimation of €207 million. Finally, in August of the same year, women's magazine 'Cosmopolitan' published an estimate of $270 million.

According to 'Der Spiegel', the majority of Natalya Kasperskaya's fortune is in the form of funds derived from asset sales. As for Kaspersky herself, in October 2015, in response to the question as to whether the 'Forbes' calculations are accurate, she emphasized that her company is non-public and thus has no need to reveal its level of capitalization, while adding that “it is nevertheless good to see that people seem to appreciate the value of 'InfoWatch'”.

=== Ratings and awards ===
• Top management rating (IT nomination), according to 'Kommersant' newspaper and Association of Russian Managers / #3 (2009), #2 (2010), #4 (2011), #1 (2013), #1 (2014), #4 (2015).; • 100 most influential women in Russia, according to 'Echo of Moscow' radio / #66 (2012), #74 (2013), #81 (2014), #62 (2015).	• Top 50 influential business women in Russia, according to 'Kompaniya' magazine / #3 (2010), #1 (2011), #25 (2012), #2 (2013), #15 (2014), #26 (2015).; • Richest woman in Russia, according to 'Forbes Woman' magazine / #5 (2013), #8 (2014), #7 (2015).

- Russian Business Leader of the Year 2012 award from 'Horasis' (Switzerland) — 2013;
- Women in Technology Awards for Middle East and Africa 2014, nomination Best entrepreneur in IT — 2014;
- Top 20 Women in Business in Northern Europe, according to 'Nordic Business Forum' — ranked #1 (2015).
- Person of the Year 2016 in IT/telecom by 'Best in Russia' award - April 2017.
- Medal of the Order "For Merit to the Fatherland" II Class (August 26, 2020) — for contributions to the establishment and development of the Russian segment of the information and telecommunication network "Internet."
- Medal of the Federal Service for Technical and Export Control (FSTEC) of Russia "For Strengthening the State Information Protection System" I Class (February 3, 2021).
- National Award for Contribution to the Fight Against the Leakage of Confidential Information — June 8, 2022

== Public work ==
Natalya Kasperskaya is a member of the board of the Russian Union of Industrialists and Entrepreneurs and the Association of Software Developers 'Domestic Software'. She is also a member of the Expert Russian Software Council affiliated to the Ministry of Telecom and Mass Communications of Russia, the Grant Committee of Skolkovo Foundation, and the supervisory board of the Skolkovo Institute of Science and Technology (Skoltech). Furthermore, Natalya Kasperskaya is a member of the Russian Mechanical Engineering Union.

From April 2008 until March 2012, Natalya was a member of the board of the Russian-German chamber of commerce. In addition, from 2009 until 2011, she was head of the working party on information and computer technologies under the federal target program of the Ministry of Education and Science of Russia, referred to as “Research and inventions in priority scientific and technology development areas in Russia in 2014—2020”.

== Personal life ==
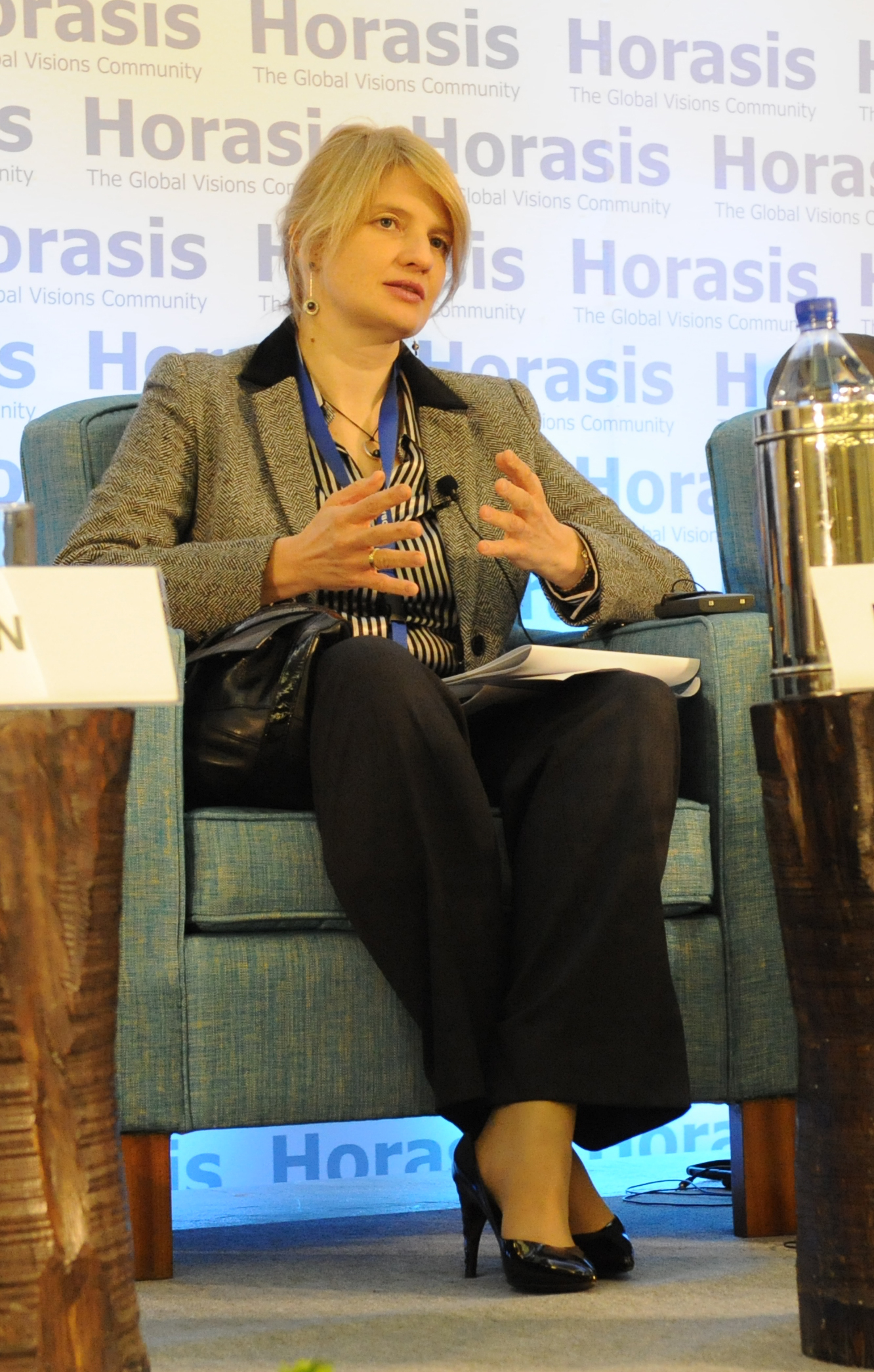
Natalya Kasperskaya (2011)

=== Interests ===
Natalya Kasperskaya has enjoyed participating in social activities ever since being at school, where she remembers singing in a children's choir, taking part in school performances and concerts, and even leading a pioneer's team of agitators. In addition, she formed her own school placard newspaper, for which she wrote poetry, and was also interested in sports like basketball, skiing and swimming, as well as phaleristics, collecting stamps and Soviet coins.

As a student, Natalya was fascinated with Moscow theatre life and knew the repertoires of the main youth theatres of that time, such as Mossovet Theatre, Taganka Theatre, Sovremennik, etc., and sometimes queued overnight to buy tickets to popular performances. Furthermore, she also had a passion for the guitar and poetry and often sang and played guitar at parties.

Natalya's interest in trekking, skiing, travelling with friends and children, and reading professional literature came later and she considers Good to Great and Built to Last written by American business consultant Jim Collins to be her favorite books, saying that they have influenced her outlook. In addition, she also speaks English and German fluently.

Kasperskaya admits that she has little interest in cooking, although she had to cook for her family during maternity leave. Similarly, she also has no particular interest in fashion and clothing brands and does not waste much time on shopping, instead buying whatever clothes she finds suit her own style. In addition, Natalya is no fan of designer brands since she knows how such clothes are actually produced.

Natalya perceives gadgets and social networks somewhat negatively as she understands that they provide capabilities for increased surveillance. While she has to regularly use her work Sony Xperia phone, Natalya typically allows her PR team to manage her social network presence and uses such media only very rarely.

=== Family ===
Natalya met her first husband, Eugene Kaspersky, at a health resort in January 1987 when she was twenty, with the couple marrying just six months later. In 1989, in her fifth year at the institute, Natalya gave birth to her first son Maxim, with a second son, Ivan, following in 1991. The couple split up in 1997 and divorced in 1998, at Eugene's instigation. However, due to their joint and rapidly growing business, the divorce had to be covered up for a couple of years in order to not demotivate employees and panic the market.

Natalya met her second husband, Igor Ashmanov, in 1996 at the CeBIT computer expo in Hannover, where they were working at neighboring stands. A year later, Natalya and Igor renewed their acquaintance and started communicating with one another regularly on a professional basis. Natalya Kasperskaya remembers that they started dating two or three years later, after the divorce with Eugene, with the couple deciding to marry in 2001.

In 2005, Igor and Natalya had a daughter, Alexandra, who was followed by a second daughter, Maria, in 2009 and a third daughter, Varvara, in 2012. Natalya's sons from her first marriage both studied at Lomonosov Moscow State University, with Maxim graduating from the faculty of Geography and Ivan from the faculty of Computational Mathematics and Cybernetics.

In April 2011, Natalya's 20-year-old son Ivan was kidnapped in the Strogino district of Moscow on his way to work, with the perpetrators holding him in one of the villages in the Sergievo-Posadsky subregion of Moscow oblast (suburb) and demanding a ransom of €3 million from his parents. However, five days later Ivan was freed thanks to the actions of the Russian intelligence services, with the five kidnappers, including two repeat offenders, being sentenced to prison terms ranging from 4.5 to 11 years.
