= For Truth =

For Truth За правду
- Leader: Zakhar Prilepin
- Founded: 1 February 2020
- Dissolved: 22 February 2021
- Merged into: A Just Russia — For Truth
- Headquarters: Moscow, Russia
- Ideology: Russian nationalism National conservatism Left-conservatism
- Political position: Syncretic; Fiscal: Centre-left to left-wing Social: Right-wing
- National affiliation: All-Russia People's Front
- Colours: Purple; Green; Red

Website
- zapravdu.org

For Truth (Russian: За правду; Za pravdu) was a national-conservative political party in Russia. It was established in February 2020 by writer Zakhar Prilepin. On January 28, 2021, the party united with the Patriots of Russia party and A Just Russia.

== History ==
The creation of the movement "For truth" was announced on 29 October 2019 at a press conference by Zakhar Prilepin, Alexander Kazakov, Vadim Samoilov, Eduard Boyakov and Vladislav Bevza.

The party has called for Russia's annexation of eastern Ukrainian territories as well as the breakaway Georgian regions of Abkhazia and South Ossetia.

On 30 November 2019, Prilepin confirmed a plan to transform the movement into a political party to participate in the elections.

On 1 February 2020, the founding congress of the party was held. At the congress, Zakhar Prilepin was elected party leader.

On 19 May 2020, the Ministry of Justice added party to the list of parties that can participate in the elections.

The party participated in the 2020 regional elections in five regions. In the Ryazan region, the party received 7% of the vote, winning 2 seats in the regional parliament, and gaining free access to federal parliamentary elections. In other regions, the party received less than 5% of the votes without passing the electoral barrier.

Logo of the For Truth movement after unification with A Just Russia

== Notable members ==
- Zakhar Prilepin, writer;
- Alexander Babakov, Senator from Tambov Oblast;
- Steven Seagal, actor;
- Nikolai Starikov, writer.
