= Rambler (portal) =

Russian search engine

- Company type: Subsidiary of Sberbank
- Founded: 1996; 30 years ago Moscow, Russia
- Headquarters: Varshavskoe shosse, 9 Moscow, Russia
- Owner: Sberbank
- Key people: Dmitry Kryukov, Creator; Olga Turischeva (CEO)
- Industry: Internet, Computer software
- Subsidiaries: Rambler; Lenta.ru; Afisha (until 2015); Gazeta.ru
- Website: www.rambler.ru

Rambler (Russian: Рамблер) is a Russian search engine and one of the biggest Russian web portals, owned by the Rambler Media Group. The site was launched in 1996 by Stack Ltd, went public in 2005, was acquired by Prof-Media in 2006, and has since been acquired by Russian bank Sberbank.

== History ==
Rambler has been online since 1996. In 2005 the Rambler Media Group went public, and was bought by Prof-Media in 2006.

On 18 July 2008 it was announced that Google was to acquire Begun, part of Rambler Media and one of the biggest Russian contextual advertising services for $140 million, but the deal was blocked by Russian Federal Antimonopoly Service.

The main competitors of Rambler in the Russian market are Yandex and Mail.ru. As of July 2013, Rambler ranked 11th in popularity among Russian sites.

In September 2016 it was reported that the site was breached in February 2012. LeakedSource received a dump of the user database at the time that included usernames, passwords, and ICQ instant messaging accounts for over 98 million users. It was revealed that the Rambler.ru database stored user passwords in plaintext — meaning that whoever breached the database instantly had access to the e-mail accounts of all of its users.

In April 2019, Sberbank, the Kremlin’s largest lender, took a stake in Rambler Media Group, in a deal organised by Russian oligarch Alexander Mamut. In October 2020, Sber, the non-banking wing of Sberbank took full control of the group when it acquired Mamut's 45% stake.

== Services ==
Services offered by Rambler include web search, e-mail, news aggregation, e-commerce and other services to the Russian-speaking community globally. It is complemented by a number of other Rambler Media Group owned web properties including:

- Lenta.ru: online Russian language newspaper
- Gazeta.ru: online Russian language newspaper
- Doktor.ru: health and medical advice
- Mama.ru: parenting advice
- Ferra.ru: information about computer equipment
- rns.online: news aggregation
- eda.ru: culinary recipes

== See also ==
- List of search engines
- Comparison of web search engines
- Igor Ashmanov
- Anton Nossik
