= Finam Holdings =

Russian financial services company

FINAM Holdings
- Type: Private
- Industry: Financial services
- Headquarters: Moscow, Russia
- Products: Stocks, Options, Futures, ForEx, CFDs, and Bonds
- Website: www.finam.ru

Finam Holdings (Russian: ФИНАМ) is a financial services company headquartered in Moscow, Russia. It is the parent company of Finam Investment Company. In April 2017 it was the third largest brokerage firm in Russia, and ranked second among providers of individual investment accounts in the country.

Finam’s subsidiaries include CJSC Finam, the asset management company Finam Management, the investment fund Finam Global, WhoTrades Ltd., Finam Bank, Finam Training Center, and FinamAero (Bolshoye Gryzlovo airfield located in the Serpukhovo district of the Moscow region).

== History ==
In 1994, Finans-Analytic Investment Company was founded by Viktor Remsha. By 1996 it became a clearing firm on the Russian Stock exchange and opened its first regional branch in Noyabrsk (Tyumen Region). By the end of the decade the company had become a member of the National Association of Securities Market Participants (NAUFOR), the Moscow Exchange (MSE), the St. Petersburg Stock Exchange, the Moscow Interbank Currency Exchange (MICEX) and the Russian Trading System. In 1999, the company launched its first workshops for investors, which later became the Finam Training Center with over 100,000 yearly students. In 2000 the company began offering online trading services and launched the finam.ru website.

In 2002 the Finans-Analytic group became Finam Holdings and began U.S. securities brokerage. In 2004, Finam acquired Megavatt Bank and later renamed it as Finam Bank.

Finam Holdings expanded internationally by becoming a member of the Frankfurt Stock Exchange and in 2011 it opened offices in Bangkok, Beijing, and New York City. Today, Finam has branch offices in 90 Russian cities.

=== Investment in IT projects ===
Finam is a leader in Russian IT investment. It has held controlling interests in sites like Mamba, MoneyMail, E-generator, and SMI2. It has had minority stakes in Badoo and Shape Gmbh.

== Structure ==
Finam Investment Holding consists of the following main divisions:

- Finam Investment Company JSC (brokerage services)
- Finam Investment Bank JSC (banking services)
- Finam Management Management Company LLC (trust management, including open-end funds)
- «Финам.ру» LLC (information and analytical agency)
- ANO "Finam Training Center"
- FINAM FOREX LLC
- FINAM Global Private Equity Fund (partners)

The group has representative offices in more than 90 cities around the world, including 84 branches in Russia, as well as offices in New York, Limassol, Karaganda, Delhi, Jakarta, Kuala Lumpur, Bangkok and Beijing.

== Directors ==
- General Director of Finam JSC — Arsen Aivazov
- Vladislav Kochetkov, President and Chairman of the Management Board of Finam Financial Group
- Chairman of the Management Board of Finam Investment Bank JSC — Andrey Shulga

== Awards ==
Every year Finam Holding becomes a laureate of industry awards, the winner of competitions and ratings. Among them:

- «Financial Olympus» — 2007, 2008, 2011, 2012, 2017, 2018;
- «Russia's financial elite» — 2007, 2008, 2009 (Grand Prix), 2010 (Grand Prix), 2011, 2012, 2013, 2014, 2015, 2017, 2019, 2021, 2023;
- «The elite of the stock market» — 2009, 2011, 2014, 2015, 2018, 2020, 2021, 2022, 2023;
- «The basis of growth» — 2012, 2013, 2014, 2015, 2016;
- «The time of innovation» — 2014, 2015, 2016, 2017, 2019, 2020, 2021;
- «The financial pearl of Russia» of journal «Family budget» — 2008, 2009;
- «Company of the Year» of journal «Company» — 2012;
- 1st place in the ranking of the largest Russian brokerage companies «РБК.Рейтинг» according to the results of 2007, 2008, 2009, 2010, 2011 years.
- «Finam Znaniya» is the best educational platform in the field of finance — 2023;

The international division of the WhoTrades holding is also marked by various awards in its markets. So in 2012 it became a laureate of the Foreign Exchange Awards of journal World Finance. In 2014 — the best social network for traders, and in 2015 — the fastest growing broker in Latin America according to the portal International Finance Magazine. In addition WhoTrades was recognized as the "best broker in Eastern Europe" (2014) and the "best innovative broker in China" (2015), receiving corresponding International Alternative Investment Review (IAIR) Awards. In 2015 it was also awarded the exhibition prize China Forex Expo in Shanghai.""
