= Nikolai Starikov =

Russian opinion journalist (born 1970)

- Николай Стариков
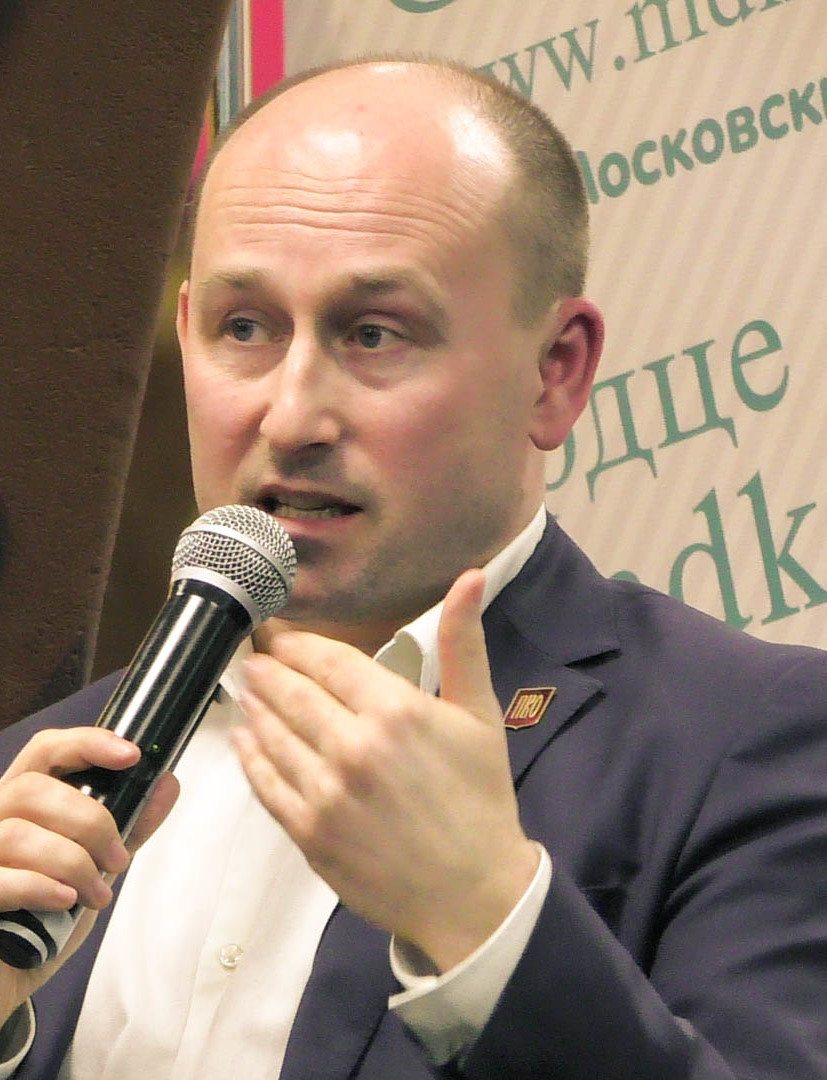

Leader of Great Fatherland Party
- In office 12 April 2013 – 2018
- Succeeded by: Andrey Zavyalov

Personal details
- Born: 23 August 1970 (age 56) Leningrad, Russian SFSR, Soviet Union
- Party: Great Fatherland Party (2013-18); For Truth (since 2020)
- Children: 2
- Education: Saint Petersburg State University of Engineering and Economics (1992)
- Website: nstarikov.ru

Nikolai Viktorovich Starikov (Russian: Николай Викторович Стариков, IPA: [nʲɪkɐˈlaj ˈvʲiktərəvʲɪtɕ ˈstarʲɪkəf]; born 23 August 1970, Leningrad) is a Russian opinion journalist. Founder and former leader of Great Fatherland Party (Russian: Партия Великое Отечество, romanized: Partiya Velikoye Otechestvo) and its subsidiary social NGO, Union of Russian Citizens (Russian: Профсоюз Граждан России, romanized: Profsoyuz Grazhdan Rossii).

Starikov is the organizer of the "Goebbels' Award," which is awarded to "people who lie about, slander and vilify Russia," following the results of a vote among readers of his websites: nstarikov.ru and nstarikov.lj.ru.

== Biography ==
Nikolai Starikov was born on 23 August 1970, in the city of Leningrad. He is married and has two daughters. In 1992, he graduated from the Saint Petersburg State University of Engineering and Economics, with a degree in economics. He frequently appears as an economics expert in documentaries, for example in "Parvus of the Revolution," "Storm of the Winter Palace Refutation."

Starikov about conspirology:

I am often accused of inclination towards conspirology. But I have always said and will continue to say that my books are related to conspirology in the same way as astronomy is related to astrology.

=== Political activity ===
Starikov is the leader of several political organizations, including the Union of Russian Citizens (Russian: Профсоюз Граждан России, romanized: Profsoyuz Grazhdan Rossii), founded on 25 April 2011, and the conservative Great Fatherland Party (Russian: Партия Великое Отечество, romanized: Partiya Velikoye Otechestvo), registered on 10 April 2013. He has championed a revisionist view of Joseph Stalin, portraying him as an effective leader and bulwark against western expansion.

In 2020, he became a member of the For Truth political party.

On 4 October 2022 Starikov in his Twitter wrote: "I urge once and for all to destroy the entire infrastructure of Nazi Ukraine. By doing this, we will save the lives of our soldiers and the lives of millions of people who are just becoming citizens of our country"

== Books ==
- "Who Killed the Russian Empire? Mystery of 20th Century.", Moscow, Yauza, Eksmo, 2006. (in Russian)
- "Myths and Truth about Civil War. Who Finished Off Russia?", Moscow, Yauza, Eksmo, 2006. (in Russian)
- "Betrayed Russia. Our 'Allies' from Godunov to Nicholas II.", Moscow, Yauza, Eksmo, 2007. (in Russian)
- "1917: Not A Revolution But Special Operation!", Yauza, Eksmo, 2007 (in Russian)
- "Who is financing Russia's collapse? From Decembrists to Mujahideen.", St. Petersburg, Piter, 2008. (in Russian)
- "Who Forced Hitler to Attack Stalin?", St. Petersburg, Piter, 2008. (in Russian)
- "Who Set Hitler Against Stalin? Hitler's Terrible Blunder", Piter, 2015 (English translation of the above book)
- "Seek the Oil. Why is Our Stabilizing Fund Placed There?", St. Petersburg, Piter, 2008. (in Russian)
- "Crisi$: How is It Organized", St. Petersburg, Piter, 2009. (in Russian)
- "Salvation of US Dollar - War", St. Petersburg, Piter, 2009. (in Russian)
- "Rouble Nationalization: The Way to Russia's Freedom", St. Petersburg, Piter, 2011. (in Russian/English).
- "Crisis: How is it done? (+ audio CD, read the author)", St. Petersburg, Piter, 2011. (in Russian).
- "Chaos and Revolution - Weapons Of US Dollar.", St. Petersburg, Piter, 2011. (in Russian).
- "Ukraine - Chaos and Revolution - Weapons Of US Dollar.", St. Petersburg, Piter, 2014. (in Russian).
