= Sekret firmy =

Russian online magazine

- Editor-in-chief: Marina Ivanyushchenkova (2001–2014); Nikolay Kononov (2015–present)
- Categories: Business magazine
- Frequency: Daily online
- Publisher: Rambler&Co formerly Kommersant
- First issue: October 2001
- Country: Russia
- Language: Russian
- Website: secretmag.ru

Sekret firmy (Russian: Секрет фирмы) is the Russian online magazine about 'entrepreneurs, companies, management insights and applied business problems'. It has been coming out since October 2001. Since December 2014 it belongs to Rambler&Co. Nikolay Kononov is the editor-in-chief.

== History ==
The Firm's Secret was created by Yuri Katsman in October 2001 as a monthly supplement to the weekly magazine Money of the publishing house Kommersant. The supplement was supposed to cover business seminars held by the publishing house in cooperation with the Higher School of Economics and Harvard Business School. Later, when the publishing house no longer needed the supplement, Katsman and his partners bought out The Firm's Secret and since September 2002 the magazine came out at first – twice a week, then – weekly. In 2004, a publishing house was established on the basis of the magazine, and also published a newspaper Business (Russian: «Бизнес») and magazines You have the right (Russian: «Имеешь право») and Everything is clear (Russian: «Все ясно»). In November 2005, the publishing house The Firm's Secret purchased an online newspaper Gazeta.ru for about $7–10 million.

== Kommersant ==
Since the spring of 2006, the publishing house was looking for buyers for its unprofitable publications (the revenues of CJSC "The Firm's Secret" (ЗАО «Секрет фирмы») according to Russian Standards of Accountants in 2005 — 216.75 million rubles, net loss — 323.56 million rubles). On December 22, 2006, it was announced that the newspaper Business was bought by the group Moskovskiye Novosti. According to experts, the deal value was about $5–6 million, while in the autumn of the same year Rodionov Publishing House planned to buy it for $10–13 million. On the same day, Kommersant bought out the remaining newspapers. Former owners – investment fund Cube Capital UK Limited (70%), Alexander Loktev and managing director Yuri Katsman – received approximately $40 million. In 2007 the new owner closed the magazines You have the right and Everything is clear, and The Firm's Secret was transformed into a monthly magazine.

For a long time Kommersant was publishing two competing publications: Money and the less popular The Firm's Secret (the Russian audience of the publications, according to TNS Russia for March–July 2014, was 238 thousand and 193,300 people over 12 years old for one issue, respectively). At the same time, the latter had a lower profitability in 2013–2014. It generated a loss while its annual revenue was about 60 million rubles, according to Vedomosti.

== Rambler&Co ==
In 2014, Kommersant received an offer from an unnamed company to buy the publication, after a while Rambler&Co showed interest in the deal. On 14 November 2014 the negotiations between the two holdings began. On December 25, it was announced that the deal has been accomplished. According to Vedomosti sources, Rambler&Co paid 10 million rubles for the brand The Firm's Secret and the right to use the electronic archive of the magazine. Then it became known that the December printed issue of the magazine would be the last one (circulation for November 2014 – 65 000 copies). It was assumed that the publication will keep part of the Kommersant team. However, Marina Ivanyuschenkova, who had been the editor-in-chief for 13 years, decided not to move to Rambler&Co. At the end of the month it was reported that the publication could be headed by the editorial director of Look At Media, Nikolay Kononov, and that a few people from Hopes&Fears (an online business newspaper which was closed in July 2014) would move to the new publication along with him.

On January 12, 2015, Kononov and four key employees of the editorial board moved to The Firm's Secret. Thereafter, the whole team of Hopes&Fears moved to the new project, except for the chief editor Anna Sokolova and editor Yuri Bolotov. According to Kononov, a series of decisions by the holding management prompted him to quit: first – the merge of H&F with The Village, which meant closing the business online newspaper that raised a monthly audience of about 800 thousand people in a year and a half, and then – using a successful name for a new English-language lifestyle newspaper. The updated editorial staff of The Firm's Secret did not include journalists from Kommersant, with the only exception of the long-time journalist Nikolay Grishin. The publication is a separate department within Rambler&Co.

On March 19, 2015, the website was relaunched on the new domain secretmag.ru. At that time, 14 people worked in The Firm's Secret. When launching the newspaper, the editorial board announced plans to release about 20 materials daily. Monetization was planned at the expense of media and contextual advertising, as well as special projects. In February 2016, the publication became one of the websites on which Rambler&Co, together with MTS, tested paid switching-off of the advertisement.
