= Runet Prize =

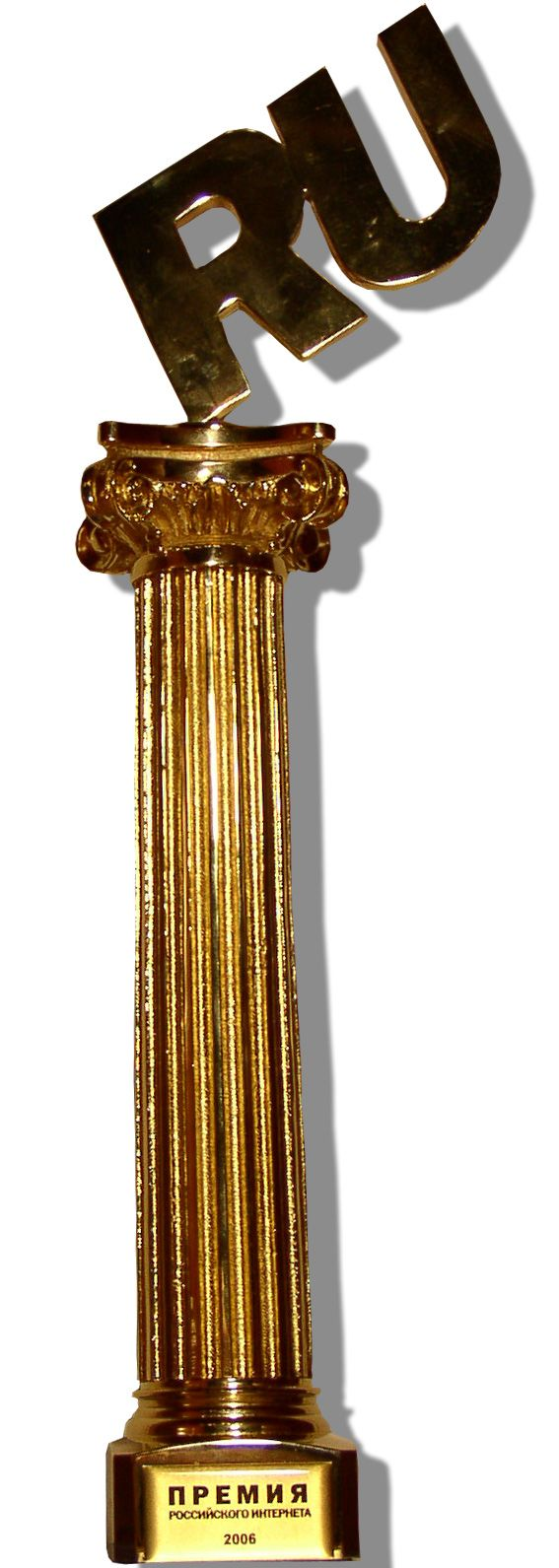
- Awarded for: Excellence in the development of the Russian segment of the Internet
- Location: Moscow
- Country: Russia
- Presented by: Rospechat
- First award: November 26, 2004
- Website: http://premiaruneta.ru/

Runet Prize (Russian: Премия Рунета) is a national award of the Russian Federation. Its founder is the Federal Agency for Press and Mass Media, the Russian governmental agency in charge of overseeing the country's mass media.

First awarded in 2004, the prize honors top Russian language (mainly Russia-based) websites in the categories:

- State and Society
- Science and Education
- Culture and Mass Communications
- Economics and Business
- Health and Recreation
- Mobile app
- Internet project
- Internet community of the year
- Game of the year.

Runet is a portmanteau of the words Russia and Internet.

== See also ==
- List of computer-related awards
