= Microsoft Defender Antivirus =

Anti-malware software

- Other names: Windows Defender Windows Security
- Original author: Microsoft
- Developer: Microsoft

Stable release(s) [±]
- Platform: August 2026 Update (4.18.26090.9) / October 12, 2026; 12 days ago
- Windows app: August 2026 Update (102.2608.18001) / September 23, 2026; 31 days ago
- Android: 1.0.9014.0101 / June 19, 2026; 4 months ago
- iOS (Note: Including iPadOS): 1.1.8116.0103 / September 24, 2026; 30 days ago
- Operating system: Windows 7 SP1+; Windows Server 2008 R2 SP1+; Android 11+; iOS 17+
- Platform: Windows
- Predecessor: Microsoft Security Essentials
- Type: Antivirus software, personal firewall, parental control, intrusion prevention, email filtering and anti-phishing
- License: Proprietary

Microsoft Defender Antivirus (formerly Windows Defender) is an antivirus software component for Microsoft Windows and mobile. It was first released as a downloadable free anti-spyware program for Windows XP and was shipped with Windows Vista and Windows 7. It has evolved into a full antivirus program, replacing Microsoft Security Essentials in downloadable genuine copies of Windows XP to Windows 7.

In March 2019, Microsoft announced Microsoft Defender ATP for Mac for business customers to protect their Mac devices from attacks on a corporate network, and a year later, to expand protection for mobile devices, it announced Microsoft Defender ATP for Android and iOS devices, which incorporates Microsoft SmartScreen, a firewall, and malware scanning. The mobile version of Microsoft Defender also includes a feature to block access to corporate data if it detects a malicious app is installed.

== Microsoft Defender brand ==
As of 2021, Microsoft Defender Antivirus is part of the much larger Microsoft Defender brand, which includes several other software and service offerings, including:

- Microsoft Defender XDR (formerly 365 Defender)
- Microsoft Defender for Cloud
- Microsoft Defender for Endpoint
- Microsoft Defender for Office 365
- Microsoft Defender for Identity
- Microsoft Defender for Cloud Apps
- Microsoft Defender Vulnerability Management
- Microsoft Defender for Threat Intelligence
- Microsoft Defender for Individuals

== Features ==
Microsoft Defender Antivirus provides several key features to protect endpoints from computer virus. In Windows 10, Windows Defender settings are controlled in the Windows Defender Security Center. Windows 10 Anniversary Update includes several improvements, including a new popup that announces the results of a scan.

=== Real-time protection ===
Windows Defender real-time notification

In the Windows Defender options, the user can configure real-time protection options. Windows 10's Anniversary Update introduced Limited Periodic Scanning, which optionally allows Windows Defender to scan a system periodically if another antivirus app is installed. It also introduced Block at First Sight, which uses machine learning to predict whether a file is malicious.

=== Browser integration ===
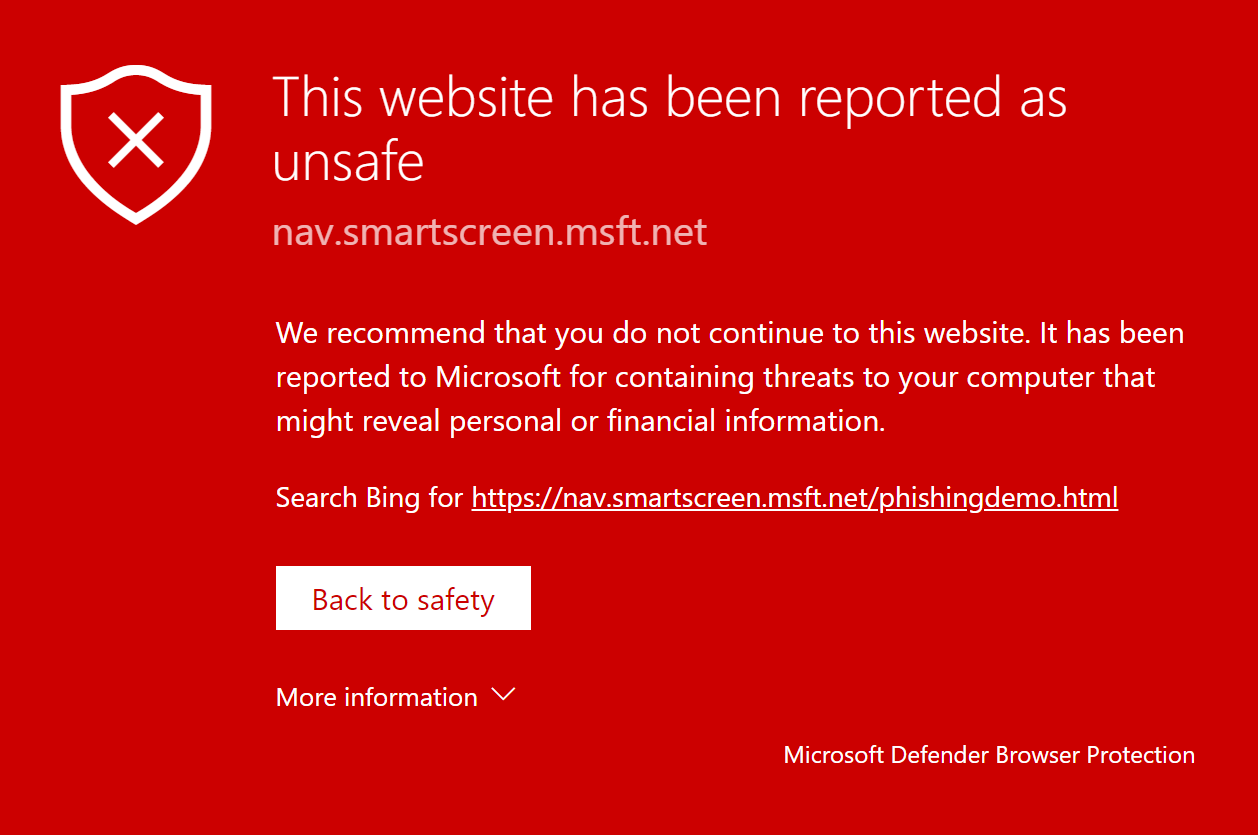
Demonstration of Microsoft Defender Browser Protection on Chrome. Pictured here is the warning that the website in question "has been reported as unsafe".

Integration with Internet Explorer and Microsoft Edge enables files to be scanned as they are downloaded to detect malicious software inadvertently downloaded. As of April 2018, Microsoft Defender is also available for Google Chrome via an extension and works in conjunction with Google Safe Browsing, but as of late 2022, this extension is now deprecated.

=== Application Guard ===
A feature released in early 2018, Windows Defender Application Guard is a feature exclusive to Microsoft Edge that allows users to sandbox their current browsing session from the system. This prevents a malicious website or malware from affecting the system and the browser. Application Guard is a feature only available on Windows 10/11 Pro and Enterprise. In May 2019, Microsoft announced Application Guard for Google Chrome and Firefox. The extension, once installed, will open the current tabs web page in Microsoft Edge with Application Guard enabled. In April 2024, Microsoft announced that Microsoft Defender Application Guard will be deprecated for Edge for Business. The Chrome and Firefox extensions will not be migrating to Manifest V3 and will be deprecated after May 2024.

=== Controlled Folder Access ===
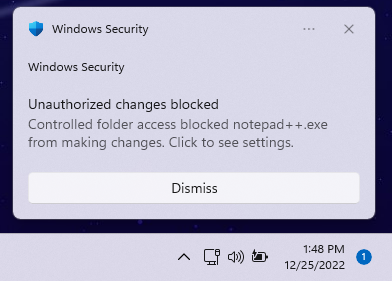
A notification showing Microsoft Defender has blocked access to a protected folder

Controlled Folder Access is a feature introduced with Windows 10 Fall Creators Update to protect a user's important files from the growing threat of ransomware. This feature was released about a year later after the Petya family of ransomware first appeared. The feature will notify the user every time a program tries to access these folders and will be blocked unless given access via the user. Windows will warn the user with a User Account Control popup as a final warning if they opt to "Allow" a program to read Controlled Folders.

=== Tamper Protection ===
Introduced in Windows 10 version 1903, Tamper Protection protects certain security settings, such as antivirus settings, from being disabled or changed by unauthorized programs.

=== Antivirus updates ===
Updates of virus definitions are released under KB2267602.

== History ==
=== Microsoft AntiSpyware (Beta 1) ===
Microsoft AntiSpyware Beta 1 (Version 1.0.701) running on Windows XP

Windows Defender was initially based on GIANT AntiSpyware, formerly developed by GIANT Company Software, Inc. The company's acquisition was announced by Microsoft on December 16, 2004. While the original GIANT AntiSpyware officially supported older Windows versions, support for the Windows 9x line of operating systems was later dropped by Microsoft.

The first beta release of Microsoft AntiSpyware from January 6, 2005, was a repackaged version of GIANT AntiSpyware. There were more builds released in 2005, with the last Beta 1 refresh released on November 21, 2005.

At the 2005 RSA Security conference, Bill Gates, the Chief Software Architect and co-founder of Microsoft, announced that Microsoft AntiSpyware would be made available free-of-charge to users with validly licensed Windows 2000, Windows XP, and Windows Server 2003 operating systems to secure their systems against the increasing malware threat.

=== Windows Defender (Beta 2) ===
On November 4, 2005, it was announced that Microsoft AntiSpyware was renamed to Windows Defender. Windows Defender (Beta 2) was released on February 13, 2006. It featured the program's new name and a redesigned user interface. The core engine was rewritten in C++, unlike the original GIANT-developed AntiSpyware, which was written in Visual Basic. This improved the application's performance. Also, since Beta 2, the program works as a Windows service, unlike earlier releases, which enables the application to protect the system even when a user is not logged on. Beta 2 also requires Windows Genuine Advantage (WGA) validation. However, Windows Defender (Beta 2) did not contain some of the tools found in Microsoft AntiSpyware (Beta 1). Microsoft removed the System Inoculation, Secure Shredder and System Explorer tools found in MSAS (Beta 1) as well as the Tracks Eraser tool, which allowed users to easily delete many different types of temporary files related to Internet Explorer 6, including HTTP cookies, web cache, and Windows Media Player playback history. German and Japanese versions of Windows Defender (Beta 2) were later released by Microsoft.

=== Windows Defender - release ===
On October 23, 2006, Microsoft released the final version of Windows Defender. It supports Windows XP and Windows Server 2003; however, unlike the betas, it doesn't run on Windows 2000. Some of the key differences from the beta version are improved detection, redesigned user interface and delivery of definition updates via Automatic Updates.

Windows Defender has the ability to remove installed ActiveX software. Windows Defender featured an integrated support for Microsoft SpyNet that allows users to report to Microsoft what they consider to be spyware, and what applications and device drivers they allow to be installed on their systems.

=== Windows Defender - Windows Vista ===
Windows Vista included several security functionalities related to the Windows Defender. Some of the functionality was removed in subsequent versions of Windows.

==== Security agents ====
Security agents which monitor the computer for malicious activities:

- Auto Start – Monitors lists of programs that are allowed to automatically run when the user starts the computer
- System Configuration (settings) – Monitors security-related settings in Windows
- Internet Explorer Add-ons – Monitors programs that automatically run when the user starts Internet Explorer
- Internet Explorer Configurations (settings) – Monitors browser security settings
- Internet Explorer Downloads – Monitors files and programs that are designed to work with Internet Explorer
- Services and Drivers – Monitors services and drivers as they interact with Windows and programs
- Application Execution – Monitors when programs start and any operations they perform while running
- Application Registration – Monitors tools and files in the operating system where programs can register to run at any time
- Windows Add-ons – Monitors add-on programs for Windows

==== Software Explorer ====
The Advanced Tools section allows users to discover potential vulnerabilities with a series of Software Explorers. They provide views of startup programs, currently running software, network connected applications, and Winsock providers (Winsock LSPs).

In each Explorer, every element is rated as either "Known", "Unknown" or "Potentially Unwanted". The first and last categories carry a link to learn more about the particular item, and the second category invites users to submit the program to Microsoft SpyNet for analysis by community members. The Software Explorer feature has been removed from Windows Defender in Windows 7.

=== Conversion to full antivirus ===
Windows Defender was released with Windows Vista and Windows 7, serving as their built-in anti-spyware component. In Windows Vista and Windows 7, Windows Defender was superseded by Microsoft Security Essentials, an antivirus product from Microsoft which provided protection against a wider range of malware. Upon installation, Microsoft Security Essentials disabled and replaced Windows Defender.

In Windows 8, Microsoft upgraded Windows Defender into an antivirus program very similar to Microsoft Security Essentials for Windows 7, and it also uses the same anti-malware engine and virus definitions from MSE. Microsoft Security Essentials itself does not run on Windows versions beyond 7. In Windows 8 or later, Microsoft Defender Antivirus is on by default. It switches itself off upon installation of a third-party anti-virus package.

Following the consumer-end launch, Windows Server 2016 was the first version of Windows Server to include Windows Defender.

=== Ongoing evolution of UI and brands ===
==== UI changes ====
Until Windows 10 version 1703, Windows Defender had a dedicated GUI similar to Microsoft Security Essentials. Additionally, Windows Security and Maintenance tracked the status of Windows Defender. With the first release of Windows 10, Microsoft removed the "Settings" dialog box from Windows Defender's GUI in favor of a dedicated page in the Settings app. Then, in the 1703 update, Microsoft tried to merge both Windows Defender's GUI and Windows Security and Maintenance into a unified UWP app called Windows Defender Security Center (WDSC). Users could still access original GUI by alternative methods, until the 1803 update, which saw the UI removed altogether. (Note: As reported in Microsoft forums, comments to news articles and other forums.) The Security and Maintenance control panel entry however, is still available in Windows 11; it contains links to reliability and performance monitoring, which is of the telemetry (one of the countless Vista major innovations) and allows to examine in depth issues detected, to the maintenance tools, File History, UAC Settings and Recovery (among others).

With the release of Windows Server 2016, Microsoft introduced a Defender module for PowerShell, which allows interacting with Windows Defender via a command-line interface (CLI).

Microsoft continued to decouple the management front-end from the core antivirus. In addition, to WDSC and PowerShell, it is possible to manage the antivirus via Windows Admin Center, Group Policy, WMI, Microsoft Endpoint Manager, and Microsoft Intune's "tenant attach" feature.

==== Changes in branding and business focus ====
In Windows 10 version 1703, Microsoft renamed Windows Defender, calling it Windows Defender Antivirus. Windows Firewall and Microsoft SmartScreen also saw their names changed to Windows Defender Firewall and Windows Defender SmartScreen. Microsoft added other components under the "Windows Defender" brand name, including Windows Defender Application Guard (WDAG), Windows Defender Exploit Guard (WDEG), Windows Defender Application Control, and Windows Defender Advanced Threat Protection (Defender ATP).

A year later, Microsoft began dissolving the Windows Defender brand in favor a of the cloud-oriented "Microsoft Defender" brand. The company removed WDSC from the brand in the 1809 update, renaming it Windows Security Center (WSC). The 2004 update renamed Windows Defender Antivirus, calling it Microsoft Defender Antivirus, as Microsoft extended Defender ATP's capabilities beyond the Windows OS.

==== Linux release ====
In October 2026, Microsoft Defender for Linux was released, supporting Ubuntu, Debian, Red Hat Enterprise Linux, Oracle Linux, Fedora, and SUSE distros. Targeted toward enterprise customers, it is available for Microsoft Defender for Endpoint Plan 2 and Microsoft 365 E5/E7 subscribers. A centralized portal to manage threat response and analysis in Linux systems is available.

== Windows Defender Offline ==
Windows Defender Offline (formerly known as Standalone System Sweeper) is a stand-alone anti-malware program that runs from bootable removable media (e.g. CD or USB flash drive) designed to scan infected systems while the Windows operating system is offline. Since Windows 10 Anniversary Update in 2016, the option to boot into Windows Defender Offline can be initiated from within Windows itself, negating the need for the separate boot disk.

== Microsoft Defender for Individuals ==
Microsoft Defender for Individuals was released to the general public in June 2022 for Windows 10, Windows 11, Mac OS, Android, and iOS devices. On Windows it works alongside Microsoft's first and third-party antivirus solutions, such as Microsoft Defender Antivirus.

Microsoft Defender for Individuals requires a Microsoft 365 personal or family license.

Microsoft Defender for Individuals is a stand-alone app that adds central management with visibility of family devices, as well as Identity Theft Monitoring (in supported regions) to existing anti-malware features on Windows devices. On macOS and Android, the app includes its own anti-malware protection and on Android and iOS it also includes web protection (malicious link detection).

All supported platforms share a common user interface, which is also accessible from a web browser through Microsoft's My Defender portal.

== Mitigated security vulnerability ==
On May 5, 2017, Tavis Ormandy, a vulnerability researcher from Google, discovered a security vulnerability in the JavaScript analysis module (NScript) of Microsoft Antimalware Engine (MsMpEngine) that impacted Windows Defender, Microsoft Security Essentials and System Center Endpoint Protection. By May 8, 2017, Microsoft had released a patch to all affected systems. Ars Technica commended Microsoft for its unprecedented patching speed and said that the disaster had been averted.

== Reviews ==
During a December 2017 test of various anti-malware software carried out by AV-TEST on Windows 10, Windows Defender earned 6 out of 6 points in detection rate of various malware samples, earning its "AV-TEST Certified" seal.

During a February 2018 "Real-World Protection Test" performed by AV-Comparatives, Windows Defender achieved a 100% detection rate of malicious URL samples, along with 3 false positive results.

An AV-TEST test of Windows Defender in October 2019 demonstrated it provides excellent protection both against viruses and 0-day / malware attacks.

On December 1, 2021, AV-TEST gave Defender a maximum protection score of 34 points after successfully managing to detect ten out of ten ransomware samples in a lab test.

In 2025, Microsoft Defender for Endpoint was included in a study of data handling practices, user choice, and update control and inspection. 14 security vendors participated in the study conducted by the Tyrolean Chamber of Commerce (WKO) and AV-Comparatives. The product demonstrated substantial flexibility: customers can minimize data sent to Microsoft from their machines, exercise granular update control, or make the product work offline.

== Criticisms ==
Microsoft Defender has often been subjected to criticisms related to privacy concerns, performance issues, and intrusive behavior in recent versions of Microsoft Windows operating systems. Microsoft Defender features cloud file analysis and file submission under Microsoft Spynet Membership which eventually became Microsoft Advanced Protection Service (MAPS) when opted in with basic or advanced membership collects user data and sends to Microsoft which raises privacy concerns among users. The cloud integration of Microsoft Defender also raised concerns among privacy advocates. The MsmpEngine of Microsoft Defender in recent versions of Windows was found to be using high amounts of system resources, especially CPU Resources when Real-time protection and scheduled scan is configured to be turned on. This issue is more apparent in PCs with Intel CPUs. Microsoft defender is configured by default to take up 50% of the system's CPU resources available by default, although this can be configured using Group Policy Editor along with limiting the process of MsmpEngine to use a Low Priority Process during a Realtime Scan and customizing scheduled scans. Recent Windows Versions also deeply integrated Microsoft Defender with the operating system using mechanisms like Early Boot Anti-Malware, Tamper Protection, etc., making it almost impossible to remove or uninstall. Although these are useful to prevent malware from disabling or removing the antivirus itself, they also lead to frustration among users who utilize and seek 3rd party alternatives. In late-July 2020, Microsoft Defender began to classify modifications of the hosts file that blocks Microsoft telemetry and data collection servers as being a severe security risk.

== See also ==
- Security and safety features new to Windows Vista
- Security and Maintenance
- Microsoft Safety Scanner
