= AeroXperience =

AeroXperience is a Windows enthusiast blog/community cited numerous times for various Microsoft-related articles. As of May 8, 2009, AeroXperience ranks within the top 70,000 sites on the internet according to Netcraft. It is semi-frequently cited for information on upcoming Microsoft technologies and has a media presence at most Microsoft conventions. On November 20, 2009, it was renamed to winJade.

== Notable Articles ==
AeroXperience has been cited thus far for at least the following notable articles:

- Internet Explorer 8 can be removed from Windows 7.
- A lesson on infinite loops (analyzing the Zune 30 leap year glitch)
- The Ultimate Steal (no, really)
- The Five Pillars of Windows 7
- Q & A with Amitabh Srivastava
- Hypothetical thoughts on what Windows 7 Milestone 3 might have

== Cultural Memes ==
AeroXperience's chief editor, Bryant Zadegan, along with fellow blogger Rafael Rivera (unaffiliated with AeroXperience) are responsible for at least one extension of Microsoft CEO Steve Ballmer's "Developers" routine, as seen at MIX08.
