= FraudWatch International =

Cybercrime

FraudWatch International Pty Ltd
- Company type: Privately Held
- Industry: Cybersecurity; Cyber threat intelligence
- Founded: 2003; 23 years ago
- Founders: Trent Youl
- Headquarters: Melbourne, Victoria, Australia
- Number of locations: London, United Kingdom; Dubai, UAE; San Francisco, California
- Area served: Worldwide
- Products: Enterprise Brand Shield, Anti-Phishing, Malware Protection & Detection, Brand Abuse, Security Awareness, Social Media Monitoring, Mobile Apps Monitoring, Cyber Threat Intelligence, Phishing data feed
- Owner: Netcraft (2023–present)
- Number of employees: 50 (February 2020)
- Website: fraudwatch.com

FraudWatch International Pty Ltd. is an internet security organization that was founded in 2003 by Trent Youl and mainly specializes in online fraud protection and anti-phishing activities. With Youl as its CEO, it is headquartered in Melbourne, Australia and has offices in London, Dubai, and San Francisco.

Its activities include anti-phishing, protection against malware, and online brand protection, offering Security as a Service to other companies. Active in sponsoring and participating in conferences on cybercrime, FraudWatch also sponsors the Anti-Phishing Working Group.

The techniques that are used by FraudWatch International include:

- Anti-phishing techniques
- Anti-vishing techniques
- Anti-pharming techniques
- Takedown of fake domains
- Takedown of fake profiles on social media

In September 2023, British based cybercrime detection company Netcraft announced the acquisition of FraudWatch. The Australian firm's staff of 70 employees will join its new owner - in turn, Youl will transition out of the company.
