= Windows Live OneCare Safety Scanner =

Online service

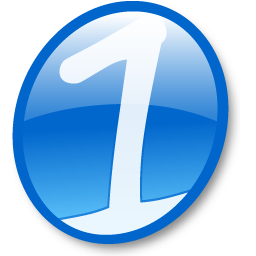

- Windows Live OneCare Safety Scanner
- Developer: Microsoft
- Final release: 1.2.969 / August 14, 2006
- Operating system: Windows 2000; Windows XP; Windows Server 2003; Windows Vista
- Platform: Internet Explorer 6 or MSN Explorer 9.2
- Type: Virus scanner
- License: Freeware web app
- Website: onecare.live.com at the Wayback Machine (archived 2008-02-23)

Windows Live OneCare Safety Scanner (formerly Windows Live Safety Center and codenamed Vegas) was an online scanning, PC cleanup, and diagnosis service to help remove of viruses, spyware/adware, and other malware. It was a free web service that was part of Windows Live.

On November 18, 2008, Microsoft announced the discontinuation of Windows Live OneCare, offering users a new free anti-malware suite Microsoft Security Essentials, which had been available since the second half of 2009. However, Windows Live OneCare Safety Scanner, under the same branding as Windows Live OneCare, was not discontinued during that time. The service was officially discontinued on April 15, 2011 and replaced with Microsoft Safety Scanner.

== Overview ==
Windows Live OneCare Safety Scanner offered a free online scanning and protection from threats. The Windows Live OneCare Safety Scanner must be downloaded and installed to your computer to scan your computer. The "Full Service Scan" looks for common PC health issues such as viruses, temporary files, and open network ports. It searches and removes viruses, improves a computer's performance, and removes unnecessary clutter on the PC's hard disk. The user can choose between a "Full Scan" (which can be customized) or a "Quick Scan".

The "Full Scan" scans for viruses (comprehensive scan or quick scan), hard disk performance (Disk fragmentation scan and/or Desk cleanup scan) and network safety (open port scan). The "Quick Scan" only scans for viruses, only on specific areas on the computer. The quick scan is faster than the full scan, hence that appellation.

The service also provides a virus database, information about online threats, and general computer security documentation and tools.

== Limits ==
The virus scanner on the Windows Live OneCare Safety Scanner site runs a scan of the user's computer only when the site is visited. It does not run periodic scans of the system, and does not provide features to prevent viruses from infecting the computer at the time, or thereafter. It simply resolves detected infections.

Many users who have posted on the Product Feedback forum report script errors relating to Internet Explorer 7 (besides IE being the only browser supported by this service). The OneCare safety scanner team have been actively solving these problems, many of them registry-related.
