= Redstone 3 =

Redstone 3 may refer to:

- Mercury-Redstone 3, a 1961 spaceflight
- Redstone 3, codename for Windows 10 Fall Creators Update, released on 17 October 2017.
