= Microsoft Safety Scanner =

Virus scan utility

- Original author: Microsoft
- Initial release: 12 April 2011; 14 years ago
- Operating system: Windows 11; Windows 10; Windows 8; Windows 8.1; Windows 7; Windows Server 2003; Windows Vista; Windows XP
- Platform: IA-32 and x86-64
- Type: Virus scanner
- License: Freeware for development and test purposes
- Website: learn.microsoft.com/en-us/defender-endpoint/safety-scanner-download

Microsoft Safety Scanner is a free time-limited virus scan utility similar to the Windows Malicious Software Removal Tool. It is used to scan a system for computer viruses and other forms of malware. It was released on 15 April 2011, following the discontinuation of the Windows Live OneCare Safety Scanner.

It is used as a more rigorous second opinion in cases where daily-use programs are suspected to have missed an infection. It is not intended to be used as a replacement for these tools, as it does not provide real-time protection, cannot update its malware definitions, and expires after ten days. Before they were discontinued, Microsoft Safety Scanner originally used the same detection engine and malware definitions as Microsoft Security Essentials and Microsoft Forefront Endpoint Protection. It now uses the same "security intelligence updates" as Microsoft Defender Antivirus. (Note: The Microsoft Safety Scanner Download article links to the page with the latest Security intelligence updates and states Microsoft Safety Scanner will match that version.)

== License restriction ==
As of 24 July 2011, Microsoft Safety Scanner's end-user license agreement permits personal usage of one copy for the development and testing of user programs.
