= Windows 10 version history =

List of Windows 10 operating system versions

Windows 10 is a major release of the Windows NT operating system developed by Microsoft. Microsoft described Windows 10 as an "operating system as a service" that would receive ongoing updates to its features and functionality, augmented with the ability for enterprise environments to receive non-critical updates at a slower pace or use long-term support milestones that will only receive critical updates, such as security patches, over their five-year lifespan of mainstream support. It was released on July 29, 2015.

== Overview ==
Overview of Windows 10 versions
| Name | Version | Codename | Build | Release date | End of support by edition | | | | | |
| Name | Version | Codename | Build | Release date | GAC | | | LTSC | | |
| Name | Version | Codename | Build | Release date | Home, Pro, Pro Education, Pro for Workstations | Education, Enterprise, IoT Enterprise | ESU | Mainstream | Extended | ESU |
|---|---|---|---|---|---|---|---|---|---|---|
| Windows 10 | 1507 | Threshold | 10240 | July 29, 2015 | May 9, 2017 | | —N/a | October 13, 2020 | October 14, 2025 | —N/a |
| Windows 10 November Update | 1511 | Threshold 2 | 10586 | November 10, 2015 | October 10, 2017 | April 10, 2018 | —N/a | —N/a | | |
| Windows 10 Anniversary Update | 1607 | Redstone | 14393 | August 2, 2016 | April 10, 2018 (Note: January 10, 2023, for Intel Clover Trail based systems.) | April 9, 2019 | —N/a | October 12, 2021 | October 13, 2026 | October 2029 |
| Windows 10 Creators Update | 1703 | Redstone 2 | 15063 | April 5, 2017 | October 9, 2018 | October 8, 2019 | —N/a | —N/a | | |
| Windows 10 Fall Creators Update | 1709 | Redstone 3 | 16299 | October 17, 2017 | April 9, 2019 | October 13, 2020 | —N/a | —N/a | | |
| Windows 10 April 2018 Update | 1803 | Redstone 4 | 17134 | April 30, 2018 | November 12, 2019 | May 11, 2021 | —N/a | —N/a | | |
| Windows 10 October 2018 Update | 1809 | Redstone 5 | 17763 | November 13, 2018 | November 10, 2020 | May 11, 2021 | —N/a | January 9, 2024 | January 9, 2029 | ? |
| Windows 10 May 2019 Update | 1903 | 19H1 | 18362 | May 21, 2019 | December 8, 2020 | | —N/a | —N/a | | |
| Windows 10 November 2019 Update | 1909 | 19H2 | 18363 | November 12, 2019 | May 11, 2021 | May 10, 2022 | —N/a | —N/a | | |
| Windows 10 May 2020 Update | 2004 | 20H1 | 19041 | May 27, 2020 | December 14, 2021 | | —N/a | —N/a | | |
| Windows 10 October 2020 Update | 20H2 | 20H2 | 19042 | October 20, 2020 | May 10, 2022 | May 9, 2023 | —N/a | —N/a | | |
| Windows 10 May 2021 Update | 21H1 | 21H1 | 19043 | May 18, 2021 | December 13, 2022 | | —N/a | —N/a | | |
| Windows 10 November 2021 Update | 21H2 | 21H2 | 19044 | November 16, 2021 | June 13, 2023 | June 11, 2024 | —N/a | January 12, 2027 | January 13, 2032 (Note: Only for IoT Enterprise) | ? |
| Windows 10 2022 Update | 22H2 | 22H2 | 19045 | October 18, 2022 | October 14, 2025 | | October 10, 2028 (Note: Only for Education, Enterprise, and Pro editions) | —N/a | | |
Legend: Unsupported Supported

== Releases ==
Mainstream builds of Windows 10 are labeled "YYMM", with YY representing the two-digit year and MM representing the month of planned release (for example, version 1507 refers to builds which initially released in July 2015). Starting with version 20H2, Windows 10 release nomenclature changed from the year and month pattern to a year and half-year pattern (YYH1, YYH2).

=== Version 1507 (original release) ===
The original version of Windows 10 (also retroactively named version 1507 and codenamed "Threshold 1") was released in July 2015. It carries the build number 10.0.10240; while Microsoft has stated that there was no designated release to manufacturing (RTM) build of Windows 10, build 10240 was described as an RTM build by various media outlets. It was retroactively named "version 1507" by Microsoft per its naming conventions that have the last 2 digits of the year and the month number for future stable releases of the operating system.

Notable changes in this version include:

- An updated start menu
- The introduction of Cortana, a virtual assistant, to the desktop version of Windows
- A "Continuum" mode that allows users to switch between desktop mode and tablet mode
- "Action Center", which includes notifications and quick access to settings
- A new web browser, Microsoft Edge Legacy, that replaces Internet Explorer as the default browser in Windows
- Improved multitasking, including virtual desktops
- Many updated built-in apps

The final release was made available to Windows Insiders on July 15, 2015, followed by a public release on July 29, 2015.

The update has reached end of service on May 9, 2017 in the Current Branch and Current Branch for Business. The Enterprise LTSB edition has reached end of service on October 14, 2025.

=== Version 1511 (November Update) ===
The second stable build of Windows 10 is version 1511 (build number 10586), known as the November Update. It was codenamed "Threshold 2" (TH2) during development. This version was distributed via Windows Update on November 12, 2015. It contains various improvements to the operating system, its user interface, bundled services, as well as the introduction of Skype-based universal messaging apps, and the Windows Store for Business and Windows Update for Business features.

New features in this version of Windows 10 include:

- Pre-installed Skype video, messaging, and phone apps
- Tab previews and syncing in Microsoft Edge
- Visual and functional tweaks

The first preview was released on August 18, 2015. The final release was made available to Windows Insiders on November 3, 2015, followed by a public release on November 12, 2015. Unlike the initial release of Windows, this branch was also made available to existing Windows Phone 8.1 devices and the Xbox One and as a preview release to Windows Server 2016, and was pre-installed on new Windows 10 Mobile devices.

On November 21, 2015, the November Update was temporarily pulled from public distribution. The upgrade was re-instated on November 24, 2015, with Microsoft stating that the removal was due to a bug that caused privacy and data collection settings to be reset to defaults when installing the upgrade.

The update has reached end of service on October 10, 2017 in the Current Branch and Current Branch for Business. Supplemental servicing for the Enterprise and Education editions was available until April 10, 2018.

=== Version 1607 (Anniversary Update) ===
The third stable build of Windows 10 is called version 1607, known as the Anniversary Update. It was codenamed "Redstone 1" (RS1) during development. This version was released on August 2, 2016, a little over one year after the first stable release of Windows 10. The Anniversary Update was originally thought to have been set aside for two feature updates, both for release in 2016. However, the second release was moved into 2017 to occur during that year's wave of Microsoft first-party devices.

The Anniversary Update introduces new features such as the Windows Ink platform, which eases the ability to add stylus input support to Universal Windows Platform apps and provides a new "Ink Workspace" area with links to pen-oriented apps and features, enhancements to Cortana's proactive functionality, a dark user interface theme mode, a new version of Skype designed to work with the Universal Windows Platform, improvements to Universal Windows Platform intended for video games, and offline scanning using Windows Defender. The Anniversary Update also supports Windows Subsystem for Linux, a new component that provides an environment for running Linux-compatible binary software in an Ubuntu-based user mode environment. This release also includes several visual changes, such as the Action center being moved to the edge of the taskbar.

On new installations of Windows 10 on systems with Secure Boot enabled, all kernel-mode drivers issued after July 29, 2015, must be digitally signed with an Extended Validation Certificate issued by Microsoft.

This version is the basis for "LTSB 2016", the first upgrade to the LTSB since Windows 10's release. The first LTSB release, based on the original release of Windows 10 (version 1507), has been retroactively named "LTSB 2015".

Editions in the Semi-Annual Channel were the first to reach end of service on April 10, 2018. The Enterprise, IoT Enterprise and Education editions have reached end of service on April 9, 2019. Support of this update for systems based on Intel Clover Trail chipset was available until January 10, 2023. The Enterprise LTSB and IoT Enterprise LTSB editions lastly reached end of service on October 13, 2026, marking the final end of support for the version of Windows 10.

=== Version 1703 (Creators Update) ===
The fourth stable build of Windows 10 is called version 1703, known as the Creators Update. It was codenamed "Redstone 2" (RS2) during development. This version was announced on October 26, 2016, and was released for general availability on April 11, 2017, and for manual installation via Windows 10 Upgrade Assistant and Media Creation Tool tools on April 5, 2017. This update primarily focuses on content creation, productivity, and gaming features—with a particular focus on virtual and augmented reality (including HoloLens and virtual reality headsets) and on aiding the generation of three-dimensional content.

It supports a new virtual reality workspace designed for use with headsets; Microsoft announced that several OEMs planned to release VR headsets designed for use with the Creators Update.

Controls for the Game Bar and Game DVR feature have moved to the Settings app, while a new "Game Mode" option allows resources to be prioritized towards games. Integration with Microsoft acquisition Mixer (formerly Beam) was added for live streaming. The themes manager moved to Settings app, and custom accent colors are now possible. The new app Paint 3D allows users to produce artwork using 3D models; the app is designed to make 3D creation more accessible to mainstream users.

Windows 10's privacy settings have more detailed explanations of data that the operating system may collect. Additionally, the "enhanced" level of telemetry collection was removed. Windows Update notifications may now be "snoozed" for a period of time, the "active hours" during which Windows will not try to install updates may now extend up to 18 hours in length, and updates may be paused for up to seven days. Windows Defender has been replaced by the universal app Windows Defender Security Center. Devices may optionally be configured to prevent use of software from outside of Microsoft Store, or warn before installation of apps from outside of Microsoft Store. "Dynamic Lock" allows a device to automatically lock if it is outside of the proximity of a designated Bluetooth device, such as a smartphone. A "Night Light" feature was added, which allows the user to change the color temperature of the display to the red part of the spectrum at specific times of day (similarly to the third-party software f.lux).

The update has reached end of service on October 9, 2018 in the Semi-Annual Channel. The Enterprise and Education editions have reached end of service on October 8, 2019. The Team edition on Surface Hub devices has reached end of service on March 16, 2021.

=== Version 1709 (Fall Creators Update) ===
The fifth stable build of Windows 10 is called version 1709, known as the Fall Creators Update. It was codenamed "Redstone 3" (RS3) during development. This version was released on October 17, 2017. Version 1709 introduces a new feature known as "My People", where shortcuts to "important" contacts can be displayed on the taskbar. Notifications involving these contacts appear above their respective pictures, and users can communicate with the contact via either Skype, e-mail, or text messaging (integrating with Android and Windows 10 Mobile devices). Support for additional services, including Xbox, Skype for Business, and third-party integration, are to be added in the future. Files can also be dragged directly to the contact's picture to share them. My People was originally announced for Creators Update, but was ultimately held over to the next release, and made its first public appearance in Build 16184 in late April 2017. A new "Files-on-Demand" feature for OneDrive serves as a partial replacement for the previous "placeholders" function.

It also introduces a new security feature known as "controlled folder access", which can restrict the applications allowed to access specific folders. This feature is designed mainly to defend against file-encrypting ransomware. This is also the first release that introduces DCH drivers.

The update has reached end of service on April 9, 2019 for Home, Pro, Pro Education, Pro for Workstations, and IoT Core editions. The Enterprise and Education editions would have originally reached end of service on April 14, 2020, but this was postponed to October 13 of the same year due to the COVID-19 pandemic.

=== Version 1803 (April 2018 Update) ===
The sixth stable build of Windows 10 is called version 1803, known as the April 2018 Update. It was codenamed "Redstone 4" (RS4) during development. This version was released as a manual download on April 30, 2018, with a broad rollout on May 8, 2018. This update was originally meant to be released on April 10, but was delayed because of a bug which could increase chances of a "Blue Screen of Death" (Stop error).

The most significant feature of this build is Timeline, which is displayed within Task View. It allows users to view a list of recently used documents and websites from supported applications ("activities"). When users consent to Microsoft data collection via Microsoft Graph, activities can also be synchronized from supported Android and iOS devices.

The update has reached end of service on November 12, 2019 for Home, Pro, Pro for Workstations and IoT Core editions. The Enterprise, IoT Enterprise and Education editions would have originally reached end of service on November 10, 2020, but this was postponed to May 11, 2021 due to the "global health crisis", in reference to the COVID-19 pandemic.

=== Version 1809 (October 2018 Update) ===
The seventh stable build of Windows 10 is called version 1809, known as the October 2018 Update. It was codenamed "Redstone 5" (RS5) during development. This version was released on October 2, 2018. Highlighted features on this build include updates to the clipboard function (including support for clipboard history and syncing with other devices), SwiftKey virtual keyboard, Snip & Sketch, and File Explorer supporting the dark color scheme mode. Also, with this version the default removal policy of external storage devices was changed from better performance to quick removal, thereby allowing safe device removal without clicking the Safely Remove Hardware menu to eject an external device.

On October 6, 2018, the build was pulled by Microsoft following isolated reports of the update process deleting files from user directories. It was re-released to Windows Insider channel on October 9, with Microsoft citing a bug in OneDrive's Known Folder Redirection function as the culprit.

On November 13, 2018, Microsoft resumed the rollout of 1809 for a small percentage of users.

The long term servicing release, Windows 10 Enterprise 2019 LTSC, is based on this version and is equivalent in terms of features.

The update has reached end of service on November 10, 2020 for Home, Pro, Pro Education, Pro for Workstations and IoT Core editions. The Enterprise, IoT Enterprise and Education editions have reached end of service on May 11, 2021. The Enterprise LTSC, IoT Enterprise LTSC and IoT Core LTSC editions will reach end of service on January 9, 2029.

=== Version 1903 (May 2019 Update) ===
The eighth stable build of Windows 10, version 1903, codenamed "19H1", was released for general availability on May 21, 2019, after being on the Insider Release Preview branch since April 8, 2019. Because of new practices introduced after the problems affecting the 1809 update, Microsoft used an intentionally slower Windows Update rollout process.

New features in the update include a redesigned search tool—separated from Cortana and oriented towards textual queries, a new "Light" theme (set as default on Windows 10 Home) using a white-colored taskbar with dark icons, the addition of symbols and kaomoji to the emoji input menu, the ability to "pause" system updates, automated "Recommended troubleshooting", integration with Google Chrome on Timeline via an extension, support for SMS-based authentication on accounts linked to Microsoft accounts, and the ability to run Windows desktop applications within the Windows Mixed Reality environment (previously restricted to universal apps and SteamVR only). A new feature on Pro, Education, and Enterprise known as Windows Sandbox allows users to run applications within a secured Hyper-V environment. Notable changes in the May 2019 Update include:

- A new "light theme"
- Separation of Search and Cortana in the taskbar
- Windows Sandbox (not available in Windows 10 Home)
- Ability to pause updates for 35 days or under (incl. Windows 10 Home)
- New default wallpaper
- Recommended troubleshooting
- Notifications hidden while in full-screen
- DirectML
- A revamped version of Game Bar with a larger overlay with a performance display, Xbox friends list and social functionality, and audio and streaming settings

The update has reached the end of service on December 8, 2020.

=== Version 1909 (November 2019 Update) ===
The ninth stable build of Windows 10, version 1909, codenamed "19H2", was released to the public on November 12, 2019, after being on the Insider Release Preview branch since August 26, 2019. Unlike previous updates, this one was released as a minor service update without major new features. Notable changes in the November 2019 Update include:

- Ability to create events from the Calendar fly-out on the taskbar
- Improvements to notification management, including thumbnails demonstrating notification banners and the Action Center in application notification settings, and the ability to access per-application notification settings from their displays in Action Center
- The Start menu's navigation sidebar icons expand into a drawer with text labels when the cursor is hovered over them
- Support for using third-party digital assistants from the lock screen
- OneDrive integration with File Explorer's search

The update has reached end of service on May 11, 2021 for Home, Pro, Pro Education and Pro for Workstations editions. The Enterprise, IoT Enterprise and Education editions have reached end of service on May 10, 2022.

=== Version 2004 (May 2020 Update) ===
The tenth stable build of Windows 10, version 2004, codenamed "20H1", was released to the public on May 27, 2020, after being on the Insider Release Preview branch since April 16, 2020. New features included faster and easier access to Bluetooth settings and pairing, improved Kaomojis, renamable virtual desktops, DirectX 12 Ultimate, a chat-based UI for Cortana, greater integration with Android phones on the Your Phone app, Windows Subsystem for Linux 2 (WSL 2; WSL 2 includes a custom Linux kernel, unlike its predecessor), the ability to use Windows Hello without the need for a password, improved Windows Search with integration with File Explorer, a cloud download option to reset Windows, accessibility improvements, and the ability to view disk drive type and discrete graphics card temperatures in Task Manager. It's also the final version of Windows 10 to come bundled with Microsoft Edge Legacy. Notable changes in the May 2020 Update include:

- Faster and easier access to Bluetooth settings and pairing
- Improved Kaomojis
- Virtual Desktops are now renamable
- DirectX 12 Ultimate
- Introducing a chat-based UI for Cortana
- Greater integration with Android smartphones on the Your Phone app
- Windows Subsystem for Linux 2 (WSL 2)
- Ability to use Windows Hello without the need for a password
- Ability to use Windows Hello PIN while in safe mode
- Cloud download option to reset Windows
- Accessibility improvements
- Support Storage Firmware Update that allow updates SSD firmware through Windows Update
- Task Manager can display disk type (HDD or SSD) in the Performance tab

The update has reached end of service on December 14, 2021.

=== Version 20H2 (October 2020 Update) ===
The eleventh stable build of Windows 10, version 20H2, was released to the public on October 20, 2020, after being on the Beta Channel since June 16, 2020. New features include new theme-aware tiles in the Start Menu, new features and improvements to Microsoft Edge (such as a price comparison tool, Alt+Tab ↹ integration for tab switching, and easy access to pinned tabs), a new out-of-box experience with more personalization for the taskbar, notifications improvements, improvements to tablet mode, improvements to Modern Device Management, and the move of the System tab in Control Panel to the About page in Settings. This is the first version of Windows 10 to include the new Chromium-based Edge browser by default.

The update has reached end of service on May 10, 2022 for Home, Pro, Pro Education, Pro for Workstations and Team (for Surface Hub devices) editions. The Enterprise, Enterprise multi-session, IoT Enterprise and Education editions have reached end of service on May 9, 2023.

=== Version 21H1 (May 2021 Update) ===
The twelfth stable build of Windows 10, version 21H1, was released to the public on May 18, 2021, after being on the Beta Channel since February 17, 2021. This update included multi-camera support for Windows Hello, a "News and Interests" feature on the taskbar, and performance improvements to Windows Defender Application Guard and WMI Group Policy Service. Notable changes in the May 2021 Update include:

- Added multi-camera support for Windows Hello
- New "News and Interests" feature on the taskbar
- Performance improvements to Windows Defender Application Guard and WMI Group Policy Service

The update has reached end of service on December 13, 2022.

=== Version 21H2 (November 2021 Update) ===
The thirteenth and penultimate stable build of Windows 10, version 21H2, was released to the public on November 16, 2021, after being on the Beta Channel since July 15, 2021. This update included GPU compute support in the Windows Subsystem for Linux (WSL) and Azure IoT Edge for Linux on Windows (EFLOW) deployments, a new simplified passwordless deployment models for Windows Hello for Business, support for WPA3 Hash-to-Element (H2E) standards and a new highlights feature for Search on the taskbar. Notable changes in the November 2021 Update include:

- GPU compute support in the Windows Subsystem for Linux (WSL) and Azure IoT Edge for Linux on Windows (EFLOW) deployments
- New simplified passwordless deployment models for Windows Hello for Business
- Support for WPA3 Hash-to-Element (H2E) standards
- Support for DirectStorage
- Support for NVMe 2.0
- Limited support for Alder Lake Thread Director
- New highlights feature for Search on the taskbar

The update has reached end of service on June 13, 2023 for Home, Pro, Pro Education and Pro for Workstations editions. The Enterprise, Enterprise multi-session, IoT Enterprise and Education editions have reached end of service on June 11, 2024. The Enterprise LTSC and IoT Enterprise LTSC editions will reach end of service on January 12, 2027 and January 13, 2032, respectively.

=== Version 22H2 (2022 Update) ===
The fourteenth and final stable build of Windows 10, version 22H2, was released to the public on October 18, 2022, after being on the Release Preview Channel since July 28, 2022. This update re-introduced the search box on the taskbar and included Copilot in Windows, richer weather experience on the lock screen, additional quick status (such as sports, traffic and finance) on lock screen and a new Windows Spotlight desktop theme and new account manager experience on the Start menu. Notable changes introduced after the initial public release of the 2022 Update include:

- Re-introduction of the search box on the taskbar
- The availability of Copilot in Windows
- Richer weather experience on the lock screen
- Additional quick status (such as sports, traffic, and finance) on lock screen
- New Windows Spotlight desktop theme
- New account manager experience on the Start menu
- New top cards with key hardware specifications of device in the Settings app
- Included Outlook progressive web app

The update would have originally reached end of service on May 14, 2024 for Home and Pro editions and May 13, 2025 for Education and Enterprise editions, but this was postponed to October 14, 2025 for all editions, following Microsoft's confirmation that it will no longer release Windows 10 builds annually.

Windows 10, version 22H2 is eligible for the Extended Security Updates (ESU) program, which offers continued security updates until October 12, 2027 for consumers, and October 10, 2028 for businesses and schools.

== See also ==
- Windows 10 Mobile version history
- Windows 11 version history
- Windows Phone version history
- Windows Server 2016 version history
- Windows Server 2019 – Version of Windows Server, released in 2018
- Windows Server 2022 – Major release of Windows Server, released in 2021
- Xbox OS version history
