= PhishTank =

Computer security software

- Industry: Computer
- Founded: 2006
- Headquarters: San Francisco, California
- Key people: Joel Esler (Project Owner)
- Parent: Cisco
- Website: www.phishtank.com

PhishTank is an anti-phishing site.

PhishTank was launched in October 2006 by entrepreneur David Ulevitch as an offshoot of OpenDNS. The company offers a community-based phishing verification system where users submit suspected menaces ("phishes"). OpenDNS was acquired by Cisco and in turn the PhishTank system was turned over to Cisco Talos.

PhishTank is used by Opera, WOT, Yahoo! Mail, Mcafee, APWG, CMU, ST Benard, Mozilla, Kaspersky, Firetrust, Officer Blue, FINRA, Message Level, SURBL, Sanesecurity for ClamAV, Career Builder, Site Truth, Avira, C-SIRT, and by PhishTank SiteChecker.

PhishTank data is provided free for download or for access via an API call, including for commercial use, under a restrictive license.

In 2018, it was announced that PhishTank will be rebuilding the website, with new features and functionality. In 2020, because of flagrant abuse of the PhishTank system, "new user" registration was removed, and will remain off for the foreseeable future. As of June 2026, new user registration remains closed. PhishTank is currently being rethought from the ground up to provide better support, remove abuse, and operate faster with a machine learning backend phish identification system. This redesign is being run by the Cisco Talos Communities team under Joel Esler. Joel Esler left Cisco Talos in 2021 and is currently the Vice President of Security, Research, and Intelligence at ThreatSTOP.

== See also ==
- Anti-Phishing Working Group
