= Microsoft Active Protection Service =

Windows Defender and Microsoft Security Essentials user network

Microsoft Active Protection Service (abbreviated MAPS and formerly known as Microsoft SpyNet) is the network of Windows Defender and Microsoft Security Essentials users that help determine which programs are classified as spyware. The signatures created for any submitted programs by the users of the product are available to all users, displayed as a bar graph that shows the percentage of people who have allowed, blocked, or removed an item. This method of spyware classification allows rare, unknown, or new spyware to be categorized as most people choose to send their data.

== Basic membership ==
The basic MAPS membership choice in Windows Defender or Microsoft Security Essentials does not alert the user of software, and changes made by software that has not been analyzed for risks. Computer information is sent (such as IP address, operating system, and Web browser), and personal information might be sent (such as search terms or data entered into forms), but will not be used to identify you or contact you.

== Advanced membership ==
The advanced MAPS membership choice in Windows Defender or Microsoft Security Essentials results in sending more information about software files, usage, and how it affects your computer. Computer information is sent (such as IP address, operating system, and Web browser), and personal information might be sent (such as search terms, data entered into forms, file paths, or partial memory dumps), but will not be used to identify you or contact you.

== Opt out ==
Users of Microsoft Security Essentials can opt out by left clicking on the task bar icon, choose settings, spynet and then choose opt-out. Included in the v2.0 there is the ability to completely opt out of this program.
