= Egress Software =

UK computer security software company

Egress Software Technologies
- Industry: Computer Software
- Founded: 2007; 19 years ago
- Founder: Tony Pepper; Neil Larkins; John Goodyear
- Headquarters: London, UK
- Key people: Tony Pepper (CEO); Neil Larkins (COO); Malcolm Locke (CFO); John Goodyear (CTO)
- Products: security software; egress switch
- Owner: KnowBe4 (2024–present)
- Website: www.egress.com

Egress Software Technologies Ltd is a UK-based software company providing security software for e-mail, secure messaging, Document and Email Classification, and associated technologies to assist secure file sharing and handling.

== History ==
Egress was founded in 2007 by Tony Pepper, Neil Larkins and John Goodyear. In 2011 Egress was awarded the Security Innovation of the Year at the British Computer Society UK IT Industry Awards.

The company experienced an influx of customers following the introduction of the European Union’s General Data Protection Regulation in 2018. In June 2021, Egress acquired Aquilai Ltd. for an undisclosed price.

In April 2024, cybersecurity awareness training vendor KnowBe4 announced the acquisition of Egress Software. The acquisition was completed three months later.

== Products ==
Egress software is for the secure transfer of emails and documents to non-secure email addresses.

=== Product certification and Agency approved listings ===
In October 2013, Egress Switch was certified by CESG against Desktop and Gateway Email Encryption Security Characteristics as part of their Commercial Product Assurance program. Egress Protect is certified by the UK's NCSC to handle Official and Official Sensitive under the UK government security classifications policy. As of April 2018 this certification lies with National Cyber Security Centre (NCSC) and was extended until 20 December 2019.
