= Netcraft =

British internet services company

Netcraft Ltd
- Company type: Private
- Available in: English
- Founded: 1994; 32 years ago 1987-09-04 (incorporation)
- Headquarters: London, United Kingdom
- Area served: Worldwide
- Founder: Mike Prettejohn
- CEO: Ryan Woodley
- Services: Cybercrime Disruption; Internet Data Mining; Digital Risk Protection
- Website: www.netcraft.com

Netcraft is a cybersecurity company based in London, England. The company provides cybercrime disruption and digital risk protection services, primarily focused on the automated detection and takedown of online threats.

== History ==
Netcraft was founded by Mike Prettejohn in Bath, Somerset. The company provides web server and web hosting market-share analysis, including web server and operating system detection. In some cases, depending on the queried server's operating system, their service is able to monitor uptimes; uptime performance monitoring is a commonly used factor in determining the reliability of a web hosting provider.

The company is also known for its free anti-phishing toolbar for the Firefox, Internet Explorer, and Chrome browsers. Starting with version 9.5, the built-in anti-phishing filter in the Opera browser uses the same data as Netcraft's toolbar, eliminating the need for a separately installed toolbar. A study commissioned by Microsoft concluded that Netcraft's toolbar was among the most effective tools to combat phishing on the Internet, although this has since been superseded by Microsoft's own Internet Explorer 7 with Microsoft Phishing Filter. The service can only process public IPv4 servers at the exclusion of IPv6. The browser extensions will display security information for a domain's IPv4 servers even when the user is connected to a different server over IPv6.

In November 2016, Philip Hammond, Chancellor of the Exchequer, announced plans for the UK government to work with Netcraft to develop better automatic defenses to reduce the impact of cyber-attacks affecting the UK. As of 2022, Netcraft operated the UK government’s National Cyber Security Centre malicious website takedown service.

In 2023, Netcraft received a $100 million investment from Spectrum Equity Management and appointed Ryan Woodley as chief executive. During this period, the headquarters moved from Bath to London. In September 2023, Netcraft acquired the Australian security firm FraudWatch International.

In 2024, Netcraft expanded its fraud detection capabilities to include the use of automated decoys designed to monitor and analyze scammer tactics. Recent company research has focused on the intersection of AI and phishing, with findings on AI models directing users to invalid login URLs and the identification of emoji usage as an indicator of AI-generated fraudulent content.

== Services and Operations ==
=== Cybercrime Disruption ===
The company operates a global takedown service targeting phishing, malware, phone scams, and brand impersonation across digital channels, including websites, social media, and mobile app stores.

=== Internet Research and Analysis ===
Since its inception, the company has performed monthly web server surveys to track the market share of web server software and hosting providers. These surveys analyze millions of sites to detect operating systems, server software and uptime statistics.

=== Brand Protection ===
Netcraft offers monitoring services that identify unauthorized online use of trademarks, logos and corporate entities. These services include the detection of fake shops, fraudulent advertisements and executive impersonation on social media platforms.

== See also ==
- Brand protection
- Anti-phishing software
- Phishing
