= Windows Spotlight =

Wallpaper image application

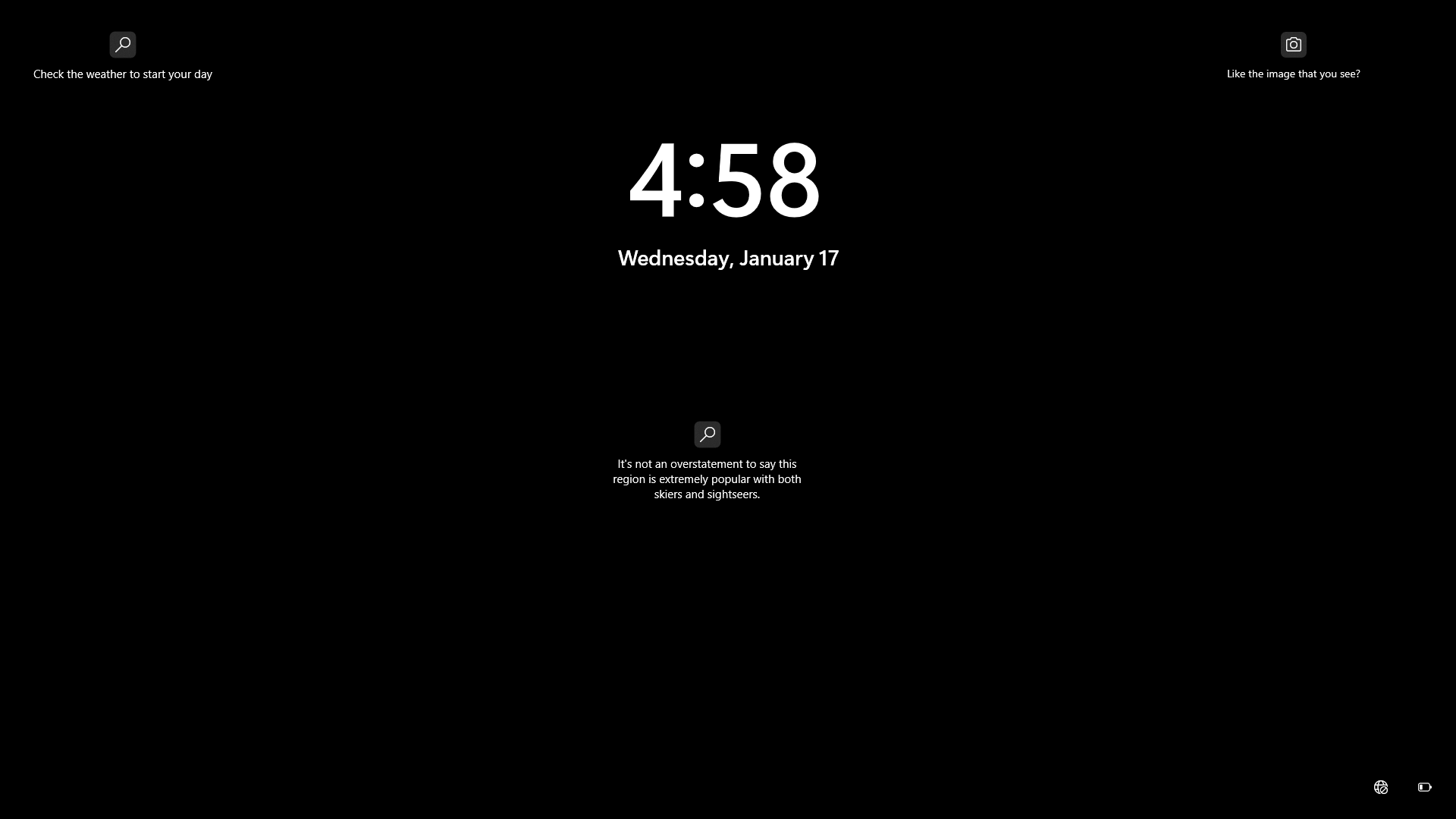
- Lock screen of a Windows 11 PC with Windows Spotlight shown on a black background
- Developer: Microsoft
- Operating system: Windows 10, Windows 11 by Microsoft
- Predecessor: Windows 8 metro style lock screen
- Type: Lock screen slideshow service

Windows Spotlight is a feature included with Windows 10 and Windows 11 which downloads images and advertisements from Bing and displays them as background wallpapers on the lock screen. In 2017, Microsoft began adding location information for many of the photographs.

== Technical details ==
Windows Spotlight images are provided by Windows' Content Delivery Manager. New ones are downloaded and shown every 1→3 days, usually in sets of two or three, with landscape and portrait versions of each image. Downloaded JPEG images are stored as an unformatted file, that is without a filename extension suffix, on the computer in the 'Assets' sub-folder of the 'LocalState' sub-folder of the 'Microsoft.Windows.ContentDeliveryManager' folder. These images can be restored easily to JPEG format image outside this folder by simply appending manually the filename extension to each of the files.

If the Content Delivery Manager has no new picture to display, a default image is used. This default fallback image can be changed.

== Photographs ==
Photograph location information is made available to the computer user. The images typically depict identifiable, well-known locations such as famous historical or natural landmarks, rarely showing any human beings, as well as a variety of close-up images of plants and animals. Some outline information is provided at the lock screen, but all the files' metadata including photo credits and date are stripped from the images.

Previously used photographs can be viewed at and downloaded from the image catalogue website: Windows Spotlight Images
