= Anti-Phishing Working Group =

International cybersecurity consortium

- Formation: 2003
- Type: 501(c) organization, Nonprofit
- Headquarters: Waltham Street 405, Lexington, Massachusetts, United States
- Main organ: Steering Committee
- Website: apwg.org

The Anti-Phishing Working Group (APWG) is an international consortium focused on providing guidance and collecting data to reduce the risks of fraud and identity theft caused by phishing and related incidents. It was founded in 2003 by a US-based company, Tumbleweed Communications in collaboration with banks, financial institutions, and e-commerce service providers.

Some APWG members are undisclosed, but as of December 2024, public members of the steering committee include Microsoft, RSA Security, Verisign, PayPal, Adobe, ICANN, Docusign, LinkedIn, Corporation Service Company, and Fortra. Research partners include the Institution of Electrical Engineers, the Cybersecurity and Infrastructure Security Agency, CERT Polska, and other CERT organizations from various countries, including the Czech Republic, Azerbaijan, and Japan.

== See also ==
- Scareware
- PhishTank
