= Cyscon =

cyscon GmbH
- Industry: Software industry, computer security, security software
- Founded: 2001
- Headquarters: Düsseldorf, Germany
- Key people: Thorsten Kraft, Thomas Wolf
- Website: www.cyscon.de

Cyscon is an IT consultancy with its main headquarters in Düsseldorf, Germany, founded by Thorsten Kraft and Thomas Wolf. Cyson was a member of a group of companies in taking down the computer virus Conficker as part of the Confiker Working Group and is a founding member of Botfrei, the German anti-botnet advisory centre. Since 2013, Cyscon was a founder of the online security audit Check & Secure and is an official partner of the Bundesamt für Sicherheit in der Informationstechnik (English: Federal Office for Information Security)

== Cyscon SIRT (C-SIRT) ==
Cyscon is responsible for C-SIRT, an online incident reporting team that works with a variety of partners to identify domain hacking and incidents of malware across the internet. Cyscon's C-SIRT is part of the VirusTotal scanning engine.

== Check & Secure ==
In 2013, Cyscon, alongside Vodafone, founded Check & Secure as part as an end-user safety initiative. The test is divided into four parts, a Router Check, a Botnet check, a Browser and Plugin check and a "Cyber Vaccination", which includes the software of SurfRight's HitmanPro.

=== Press coverage ===
In January 2014 and again in April 2014, massive data thefts, mostly of email addresses and passwords, were discovered in Germany, causing panic amongst the general public. Check & Secure was cited in German magazines such as Spiegel and Stern as a solution to the issue, as users were advised to update their browsers and plugins using the tool.

=== Co-operation with BSI ===
As part of the reaction to the issue of 18 million email accounts being lost, the Federal Office for Information Security set up a service with which the general public could check whether their own address had been compromised. Although cyscon were initially critical of the methods used by the BSI in an article on the Check & Secure blog, the company has since worked with the ministry to improve consumer safety in Germany, becoming a member of the newly formed Alianz für Cybersicherheit (English: Alliance for Cyber Security).

=== STOP. THINK. CONNECT ===
Early in 2014, Check & Secure announced its partnership with the STOP. THINK. CONNECT program, powered by the National Cyber Security Alliance. Check & Secure is an international partner of the program and will as such focus on consumers in Germany and Russia.

== Swiss Internet Security Alliance ==
In September 2014, Cyscon was named as the technical provider for the Swiss Internet Security Alliance. The partnership between cyscon and partners such as Swisscom and Sunrise was a national online project focusing on end user security. The SISA portal followed the template set by Check & Secure.

== PhishKiller ==
Cyscon partnered with Opera (web browser) in June 2015 to create PhishKiller. PhishKiller was a collaborative project with partners from several European countries as well as Australia. The project was intended to provide National online incident reporting teams, security vendors and end users with tools for the recognition of Phishing. The initiative was ended in 2016.
