= OPSWAT =

American cybersecurity company

OPSWAT, Inc.
- Type: Private
- Industry: Cybersecurity
- Founded: 2002
- Founder: Benny Czarny
- Key people: Benny Czarny (CEO, founder)
- Products: MetaDefender, MetaAccess, Cross‑Domain solutions, etc.
- Services: File security, malware prevention, network access control, zero-day protection
- Website: opswat.com

OPSWAT, Inc. is an American cybersecurity company that develops software and hardware for critical infrastructure protection (CIP) across information technology (IT), operational technology (OT), and industrial control systems (ICS). Its products are used for threat detection, endpoint security, and cloud and network protection.

The company was founded in 2002 by Benny Czarny in San Francisco, California. As of 2025, it has offices and critical infrastructure protection laboratories in Dubai (UAE), Ho Chi Minh City (Vietnam), London (UK), Petah Tikva (Israel), Tampa and Washington, D.C. (US), Timișoara (Romania), Tokyo (Japan), and Veszprém (Hungary).

OPSWAT's technologies have been integrated into security products from firms such as Cisco, Microsoft, Symantec, and F5 Networks. The company also publishes research and reports on cybersecurity threats and vulnerabilities.

== History ==
OPSWAT was founded in 2002 by Benny Czarny in San Francisco. Initially, the company developed cybersecurity tools for file and device protection. In 2004, it released the OESIS Framework SDK, a software development kit for detecting security software and automating patch management. A certification program for antivirus and endpoint security was launched in 2007.

The company expanded through acquisitions, beginning with MetaDefender in 2009 and including companies such as Impulse (2019), Bayshore Networks (2021), SNDBOX (2021), and FileScan.IO (2022). More recent acquisitions include InQuest (2024) and Fend Incorporated (2025), which expanded its operations in network detection, malware analysis, and OT security.

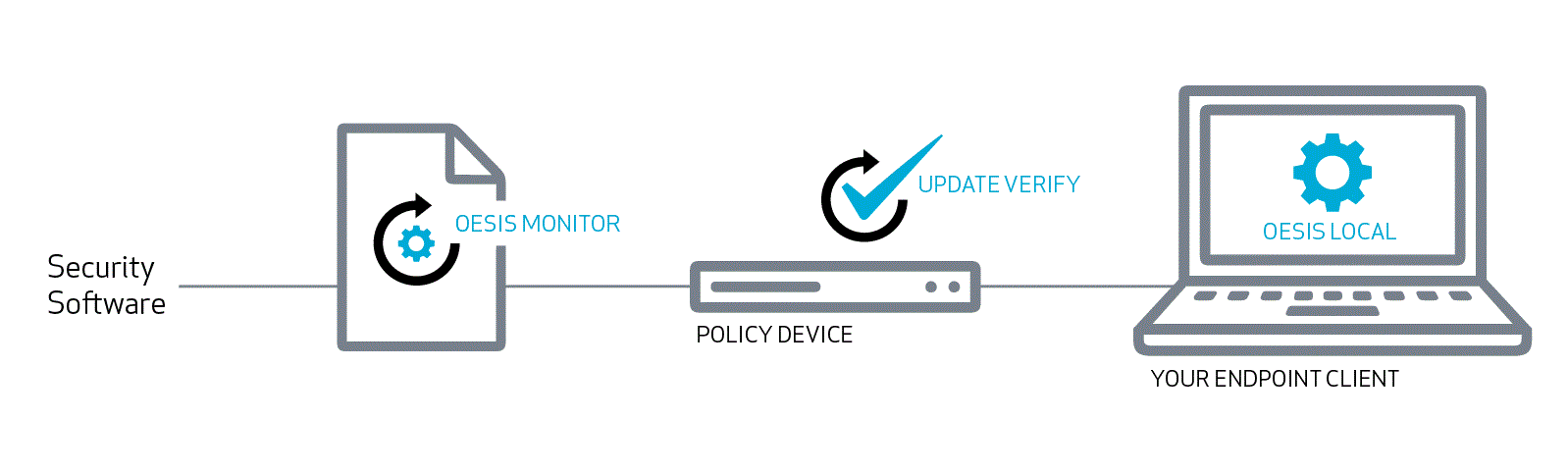
OESIS Framework Architecture, released in 2004

In 2021, OPSWAT raised $125 million in Series A funding from Brighton Park Capital. The company moved its headquarters to Tampa, Florida, in 2022.

In 2023, OPSWAT opened an office in Hanoi, Vietnam, and in 2025, it established a new location in Arlington County, Virginia.

As of 2023, OPSWAT had around 400 employees and 10 offices. It also operates out of other offices in Australia and New Zealand, India, Saudi Arabia, Singapore.

== Technologies and products ==
OPSWAT develops cybersecurity software used for system assessment, threat detection, and compliance enforcement. Its SDK supports detection of antivirus, antispyware, VPN, anti-spam, and anti-phishing software and enforces patch management.

Its software is licensed by companies including Cisco, F5 Networks, Symantec, Juniper Networks, and Microsoft. OPSWAT technology has been integrated into products such as Clean Access NAC (Cisco), FirePass SSL VPN (F5 Networks), SSL VPN (Juniper Networks), and Whole Security Confident Online (Symantec).

Key products include MetaDefender, a platform for threat detection through multiscanning, content disarm and reconstruction (CDR), file vulnerability assessment, and data loss prevention (DLP), and MetaAccess, a tool for endpoint compliance and cloud access control that manages access based on device status and security posture.

== Acquisitions ==
#	Date	Company	Business	Country	Value (USD)	Ref(s).
1	July 20, 2009	MetaDefender	Antivirus scanning engine toolkit	United States	—	
2	February 15, 2012	Napera Networks	Cloud-based network monitoring	United States	—	
3	January 20, 2015	Red Earth Software	Email security and file transfer	United States	—	
4	December 1, 2019	Impulse	Network access control	United States	—	
5	July 19, 2021	Bayshore Networks	OT and ICS cybersecurity	United States	—	
6	September 10, 2021	SNDBOX	Malware analysis sandbox	Israel	—	
7	April 1, 2022	CIP Cyber	Critical infrastructure protection services	United States	—	
8	October 27, 2022	FileScan.IO	Malware analysis	United States	—	
9	August 7, 2024	InQuest	Network detection and threat intelligence	United States	—	
10	December 18, 2024	Fend Incorporated	Data diode and OT gateway solutions	United States	—	

== Research ==
OPSWAT conducts research on malware, operational technology security, vulnerability assessment, air-gapped networks, and industrial control systems. It publishes analytical reports and market analyses related to antivirus, antispyware, and encryption technologies.

In 2025, OPSWAT released the Threat Landscape Report, analyzing file executions in sandbox environments to study malware behavior and detection rates. The report noted an increase in malware complexity and indicated that one in fourteen threats were not detected by traditional security tools.

In April 2025, OPSWAT specialists reported three vulnerabilities in the Rack::Static component for Ruby (CVE-2025-27610, CVE-2025-27111, CVE-2025-25184) that could have allowed attackers to access files and modify server logs.

Also in 2025, OPSWAT and the Ponemon Institute published a report on file security, which identified insider data leaks as a commonly reported security concern. According to the study, 27% of organizations use data loss prevention (DLP) technologies to combat insider threats.
