= Object Module Format (Intel) =

Object file format

(Relocatable) Object Module Format
- Filename extension: .omf, .obj
- Developed by: Tool Interface Standards Committee
- Type of format: Object file

The Object Module Format (OMF) is an object file format used primarily for software intended to run on Intel 80x86 microprocessors. It was originally developed by Intel around 1975–1977 for ISIS-II, targeting the 8-bit Intel 8080/8085 processors. This variant later became known as OMF-80. As OMF-86 it was adapted to the 16-bit 8086 processor in 1978.

Version 4.0 of OMF for the 8086 family was released in 1981 under the name Relocatable Object Module Format, and is perhaps best known to DOS users as an .OBJ file. Versions for the 80286 (OMF-286) and the 32-bit 80386 processors (OMF-386) were introduced in 1981 and 1985, respectively. It has since been standardized by the Tool Interface Standards Committee and was also extended by Microsoft and IBM (IBM-OMF). Intel also adapted the format to the 8051 microcontroller (OMF-51 and AOMF).

== File format ==
Many object file formats consist of a set of tables, such as the relocation table, which are either stored on fixed positions in the file, like the a.out format, or are pointed to by the header, like the ELF format. The "sections", code, data area, etc., are stored as contiguous areas of bytes within such files.

The Relocatable Object Module Format, however, was designed to require minimal memory when linking, and consists of a series of records that have the following format:

| Size | Contents |
|---|---|
| 1 byte | Record type, for example relocation information |
| 2 bytes | Data length (N+1) |
| N bytes | Data (varies depending on the record type) |
| 1 byte | Checksum or 0 |

There is a wide variety of record types because of consolidation of OMF variants from several vendors, and because of adding such features as 32-bit code and dynamic linking. These are important record types:

- COMENT - (88h) Comment, which may also contain control information.
- EXTDEF - (8Ch) Defines external references
- PUBDEF - (90h/91h) Identifies external symbols in this module
- SEGDEF - (98h/99h) Identifies segments
- GRPDEF - (9Ah) Identifies groups of segments, for example MS-DOS DGROUP
- FIXUPP - (9Ch/9Dh) Fixup or relocation records
- LEDATA - (A0h/A1h) Contains text of a code or data section
- COMDEF - (B0h) Uninitialized common data
- COMDAT - (C2h/C3h) Initialized common data
- MODEND - (8Ah/8Bh) Indicates end of module

There is no header containing file offsets, such as a pointer to a symbol table, in the file; a linker must completely parse the object file to extract all the information.

In the OMF format the data of one section is not necessarily stored as contiguous bytes in the file, instead it can be represented by multiple records. The file format specification (version 1.1) says that this must be done for sections larger than 1 KiB. Records containing relocation information (fixups) must be stored immediately following the data records of the section they apply to, so the section data and the relocation information is "mixed" in the file.

The file format provides special records (LIDATA) that allow compression of repeating data sequences in an object file. It also provides the possibility to store the symbol name of the entry point of the later executable file in one object file.

The file format can also be used as library file format.

== Use ==
The file format is the most important object file format under DOS, 16-bit Windows, and 16-bit and 32-bit OS/2.

Few toolchains use the 32-bit version of the OMF format. For example, the Watcom C toolchain allows generating code for targets that use 32-bit segmented memory layouts; Iron Spring PL/I can generate code for OS/2 32-bit flat memory layouts.

The Embarcadero Delphi compiler used this format when generating obj files for C++. It was the only format of object files that could be linked to a program or unit written in Object Pascal prior to version XE2 of Delphi, which introduced support of COFF format, along with 64-bit Windows target.

== See also ==
- Common Object File Format (COFF)
- Executable and Linkable Format (ELF)
- a.out
- Object file
- Object Module Format (VME) (OMF as used by ICL VME)
- Object Module Format (Apple) (OMF as used by ORCA / Apple IIGS)
