= Extended Common Object File Format =

Extended Common Object File Format may refer to:

- ECOFF, developed for the MIPS platform
- XCOFF, by IBM for AIX
