= Fat binary =

Combined executable file for multiple processor types or operating systems

A fat binary (or multiarchitecture binary) is a computer executable program or library which has been expanded (or "fattened") with code native to multiple instruction sets which can consequently be run on multiple processor types. This results in a file larger than a normal one-architecture binary file, thus the name.

The usual method of implementation is to include a version of the machine code for each instruction set, preceded by a single entry point with code compatible with all operating systems, which executes a jump to the appropriate section. Alternative implementations store different executables in different forks, each with its own entry point that is directly used by the operating system.

The use of fat binaries is not common in operating system software, except on NeXTSTEP and NeXTSTEP-derived Apple operating systems such as macOS and iOS (see below); there are several alternatives to solve the same problem, such as the use of an installer program to choose an architecture-specific binary at install time (such as with Android multiple APKs), selecting an architecture-specific binary at runtime (such as with Plan 9's union directories and GNUstep's fat bundles), distributing software in source code form and compiling it in-place, or the use of a virtual machine (such as with Java) and just-in-time compilation.

== Apollo ==
=== Apollo's compound executables ===
In 1988, Apollo Computer's Domain/OS SR10.1 introduced a new file type, "cmpexe" (compound executable), that bundled binaries for Motorola 680x0 and Apollo PRISM executables.

== Apple ==
=== Apple's fat binary ===
A fat-binary scheme smoothed the Apple Macintosh's transition, beginning in 1994, from 68k microprocessors to PowerPC microprocessors. Many applications for the old platform ran transparently on the new platform under an evolving emulation scheme, but emulated code generally runs slower than native code. Applications released as "fat binaries" took up more storage space, but they ran at full speed on either platform. This was achieved by packaging both a 68k-compiled version and a PowerPC-compiled version of the same program into their executable files. The older 68k code (CFM-68K or classic 68K) continued to be stored in the resource fork, while the newer PowerPC code was contained in the data fork, in PEF format.

Fat binaries were larger than programs supporting only the PowerPC or 68k, which led to the creation of a number of utilities that would strip out the unneeded version. In the era of small hard drives, when 80 MB hard drives were a common size, these utilities were sometimes useful, as program code was generally a large percentage of overall drive usage, and stripping the unneeded members of a fat binary would free up a significant amount of space on a hard drive.

=== NeXT's/Apple's multi-architecture binaries ===
==== NeXTSTEP Multi-Architecture Binaries ====
Fat binaries are a feature of NeXT's NeXTSTEP/OPENSTEP operating system, starting with NeXTSTEP 3.1.

In NeXTSTEP, they are called "Multi-Architecture Binaries". Multi-Architecture Binaries were originally intended to allow software to be compiled to run both on NeXT's Motorola 68k-based hardware and on Intel IA-32-based PCs running NeXTSTEP, with a single binary file for both platforms.

It was then used to allow OPENSTEP applications to run on PCs and the other platforms OPENSTEP supported (m68k/SPARC/PA-RISC).

Multi-Architecture (fat) binaries are a feature of the Mach-O format.

The tool chain and the IDE were extended to easily cross-compile. There were some checkboxes to select which architectures to include.

Every Multi-Architecture Binary starts with a structure (struct fat_header) containing two unsigned integers. The first integer ("magic") is used as a magic number to identify this file as a Fat Binary. The second integer (nfat_arch) defines how many Mach-O Files the archive contains (how many instances of the same program for different architectures). After this header, there are nfat_arch number of fat_arch structures (struct fat_arch). This structure defines the offset (from the start of the file) at which to find the file, the alignment, the size and the CPU type and subtype which the Mach-O binary (within the archive) is targeted at.

The version of the GNU Compiler Collection shipped with the Developer Tools was able to cross-compile source code for the different architectures on which NeXTSTEP was able to run. For example, it was possible to choose the target architectures with multiple '-arch' options (with the architecture as argument). This was a convenient way to distribute a program for NeXTSTEP running on different architectures.

It was also possible to create libraries (e.g. using NeXTSTEP's libtool) with different targeted object files.

==== Mach-O and Mac OS X ====
Apple Computer acquired NeXT in 1996 and continued to work with the OPENSTEP code. Mach-O became the native object file format in Apple's free Darwin operating system (2000) and Apple's Mac OS X (2001), and NeXT's Multi-Architecture Binaries continued to be supported by the operating system. Under Mac OS X, Multi-Architecture Binaries can be used to support multiple variants of an architecture, for instance to have different versions of 32-bit code optimized for the PowerPC G3, PowerPC G4, and PowerPC 970 generations of processors. It can also be used to support multiple architectures, such as 32-bit and 64-bit PowerPC, or PowerPC and x86, or x86-64 and ARM64.

==== Apple's Universal binary ====
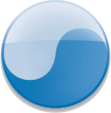
Apple Universal binary logo

In 2005, Apple announced another transition, from PowerPC processors to Intel x86 processors. Apple promoted the distribution of new applications that support both PowerPC and x86 natively by using executable files in Multi-Architecture Binary format. Apple calls such programs "Universal applications" and calls the file format "Universal binary" as perhaps a way to distinguish this new transition from the previous transition, or other uses of Multi-Architecture Binary format.

Universal binary format was not necessary for forward migration of pre-existing native PowerPC applications; from 2006 to 2011, Apple supplied Rosetta, a PowerPC (PPC)-to-x86 dynamic binary translator, to play this role. However, Rosetta had a fairly steep performance overhead, so developers were encouraged to offer both PowerPC and Intel binaries, using Universal binaries. The obvious cost of Universal binaries is that every installed executable file is larger, but in the years between the introduction of Mac OS X and the switch to Intel, hard-drive space greatly outstripped executable size; while a Universal binary might be double the size of a single-platform version of the same application, the extra size is generally negligible given the amount of free space usually available. In fact, Universal-binary applications are often smaller than two single-architecture applications because program resources can be shared rather than duplicated. If not all of the architectures are required, the lipo and ditto command-line applications can be used to remove versions from the Multi-Architecture Binary image, thereby creating what is sometimes called a thin binary.

In addition, Multi-Architecture Binary executables can contain code for both 32-bit and 64-bit versions of PowerPC and x86, allowing applications to be shipped in a form that supports 32-bit processors but that makes use of the larger address space and wider data paths when run on 64-bit processors.

In versions of the Xcode development environment from 2.1 through 3.2 (running on Mac OS X 10.4 through Mac OS X 10.6), Apple included utilities which allowed applications to be targeted for both Intel and PowerPC architecture; universal binaries could eventually contain up to four versions of the executable code (32-bit PowerPC, 32-bit x86, 64-bit PowerPC, and 64-bit x86). However, PowerPC support was removed from Xcode 4.0 and is therefore not available to developers running Mac OS X 10.7 or greater.

In 2020, Apple announced another transition, this time from Intel x86 processors to Apple silicon (ARM64 architecture). To smooth the transition Apple added support for the Universal 2 binary format; Universal 2 binary files are Multi-Architecture Binary files containing both x86-64 and ARM64 executable code, allowing the binary to run natively on both 64-bit Intel and 64-bit Apple silicon. Additionally, Apple introduced Rosetta 2 dynamic binary translation for x86 to Arm64 instruction set to allow users to run applications that do not have Universal binary variants.

==== Apple Fat EFI binary ====
In 2006, Apple switched from PowerPC to Intel CPUs, and replaced Open Firmware with EFI. However, by 2008, some of their Macs used 32-bit EFI and some used 64-bit EFI. For this reason, Apple extended the EFI specification with "fat" binaries that contained both 32-bit and 64-bit EFI binaries.

== CP/M and DOS ==
=== Combined COM-style binaries for CP/M-80 and DOS ===
CP/M-80, MP/M-80, Concurrent CP/M, CP/M Plus, Personal CP/M-80, SCP and MSX-DOS executables for the Intel 8080 (and Zilog Z80) processor families use the same .COM file extension as DOS-compatible operating systems for Intel 8086 binaries. (Note: This isn't a problem for CP/M-86 style executables under CP/M-86, CP/M-86 Plus, Personal CP/M-86, S5-DOS, Concurrent CP/M-86, Concurrent DOS, Concurrent DOS 286, FlexOS, Concurrent DOS 386, DOS Plus, Multiuser DOS, System Manager and REAL/32 because they use the file extension .CMD rather than .COM for these files. (The .CMD extension, however, is conflictive with the file extension for batchjobs written for the command line processor CMD.EXE under the OS/2 and Windows NT operating system families.)) In both cases programs are loaded at offset +100h and executed by jumping to the first byte in the file. As the opcodes of the two processor families are not compatible, attempting to start a program under the wrong operating system leads to incorrect and unpredictable behaviour.

In order to avoid this, some methods have been devised to build fat binaries which contain both a CP/M-80 and a DOS program, preceded by initial code which is interpreted correctly on both platforms. The methods either combine two fully functional programs each built for their corresponding environment, or add stubs which cause the program to exit gracefully if started on the wrong processor. For this to work, the first few instructions (sometimes also called gadget headers) in the .COM file have to be valid code for both 8086 and 8080 processors, which would cause the processors to branch into different locations within the code. For example, the utilities in Simeon Cran's emulator MyZ80 start with the opcode sequence EBh, 52h, EBh. An 8086 sees this as a jump and reads its next instruction from offset +154h whereas an 8080 or compatible processor goes straight through and reads its next instruction from +103h. A similar sequence used for this purpose is EBh, 03h, C3h. John C. Elliott's FATBIN is a utility to combine a CP/M-80 and a DOS .COM file into one executable. His derivative of the original PMsfx modifies archives created by Yoshihiko Mino's PMarc to be self-extractable under both CP/M-80 and DOS, starting with EBh, 18h, 2Dh, 70h, 6Dh, 73h, 2Dh to also include the "-pms-" signature for self-extracting PMA archives, thereby also representing a form of executable ASCII code.

Another method to keep a DOS-compatible operating system from erroneously executing .COM programs for CP/M-80 and MSX-DOS machines is to start the 8080 code with C3h, 03h, 01h, which is decoded as a "RET" instruction by x86 processors, thereby gracefully exiting the program, (Note: This works because a (suitable) return instruction can be used to exit programs under CP/M-80, CP/M-86 and DOS, although the opcodes, exact conditions and underlying mechanisms differ: Under CP/M-80, programs can terminate (that is, warm boot into the BIOS) by jumping to 0 in the zero page, either directly with RST 0 (8080/8085/Z80 opcode C7h), or by calling BDOS function 0 through the CALL 5 interface. Alternatively, as the stack is prepared to hold a 0 return address before passing control to a loaded program, they can, for as long as the stack is flat, also be exited by issuing a RET (opcode C9h) instruction, thereby falling into the terminating code at offset 0 in the zero page. Although DOS has a dedicated INT 20h interrupt as well as INT 21h API sub-functions to terminate programs (which are preferable for more complicated programs), for machine-translated programs DOS also emulates CP/M's behaviour to some extent: A program can terminate itself by jumping to offset 0 in its PSP (the equivalent to CP/M's zero page), where the system had previously planted an INT 20h instruction. Also, a loaded program's initial stack is prepared to hold a word of 0, so that a program issuing a near return RETN (8088/8086 opcode C3h) will implicitly jump to the start of its code segment as well, thereby eventually reaching the INT 20h as well.^{[a]} In CP/M-86, the zero page is structured differently and there is no CALL 5 interface, but the stack return method and BDOS function 0 (but now through INT E0h) both work as well.) while it will be decoded as "JP 103h" instruction by 8080 processors and simply jump to the next instruction in the program. Similar, the CP/M assembler Z80ASM+ by SLR Systems would display an error message when erroneously run on DOS.

Some CP/M-80 3.0 .COM files may have one or more RSX overlays attached to them by GENCOM. If so, they start with an extra 256-byte header (one page). In order to indicate this, the first byte in the header is set to magic byte C9h, which works both as a signature identifying this type of COM file to the CP/M 3.0 executable loader, as well as a "RET" instruction for 8080-compatible processors which leads to a graceful exit if the file is executed under older versions of CP/M-80.

C9h is never appropriate as the first byte of a program for any x86 processor (it has different meanings for different generations, (Note: On 8088/8086 processors, the opcode C9h is an undocumented alias for CBh ("RETF", popping CS:IP from the stack), whereas it decodes as "LEAVE" (set SP to BP and pop BP) on 80188/80186 and newer processors.) but is never a meaningful first byte); the executable loader in some versions of DOS rejects COM files that start with C9h, avoiding incorrect operation.

Similar overlapping code sequences have also been devised for combined Z80/6502, 8086/68000 or x86/MIPS/ARM binaries.

=== Combined binaries for CP/M-86 and DOS ===
CP/M-86 and DOS do not share a common file extension for executables. Thus, it is not normally possible to confuse executables. However, early versions of DOS had so much in common with CP/M in terms of its architecture that some early DOS programs were developed to share binaries containing executable code. One program known to do this was WordStar 3.2x, which used identical overlay files in their ports for CP/M-86 and MS-DOS, and used dynamically fixed-up code to adapt to the differing calling conventions of these operating systems at runtime.

Digital Research's GSX for CP/M-86 and DOS also shares binary identical 16-bit drivers.

=== Combined COM and SYS files ===
DOS device drivers (typically with file extension .SYS) start with a file header whose first four bytes are FFFFFFFFh by convention, although this is not a requirement. This is fixed up dynamically by the operating system when the driver loads (typically in the DOS BIOS when it executes DEVICE statements in CONFIG.SYS). Since DOS does not reject files with a .COM extension to be loaded per DEVICE and does not test for FFFFFFFFh, it is possible to combine a COM program and a device driver into the same file by placing a jump instruction to the entry point of the embedded COM program within the first four bytes of the file (three bytes are usually sufficient). If the embedded program and the device driver sections share a common portion of code, or data, it is necessary for the code to deal with being loaded at offset +0100h as a .COM style program, and at +0000h as a device driver. For shared code loaded at the "wrong" offset but not designed to be position-independent, this requires an internal address fix-up similar to what would otherwise already have been carried out by a relocating loader, except for that in this case it has to be done by the loaded program itself; this is similar to the situation with self-relocating drivers but with the program already loaded at the target location by the operating system's loader.

=== Crash-protected system files ===
Under DOS, some files, by convention, have file extensions which do not reflect their actual file type. (Note: This problem could have been avoided by choosing non-conflicting file extensions, but, once introduced, these particular file names were retained from very early versions of MS-DOS/PC DOS for compatibility reasons with (third-party) tools hard-wired to expect these specific file names.) For example, COUNTRY.SYS is not a DOS device driver, (Note: Other DOS files of this type are KEYBOARD.SYS, a binary keyboard layout database file for the keyboard driver KEYB under MS-DOS and PC DOS, IO.SYS containing the DOS BIOS under MS-DOS, and MSDOS.SYS, a text configuration file under Windows 95/MS-DOS 7.0 and higher, but originally a binary system file containing the MS-DOS kernel. However, MS-DOS and PC DOS do not provide crash-protected system files at all, and these file names are neither used nor needed in DR-DOS 7.02 and higher, which otherwise does provide crash-protected system files.) but a binary NLS database file for use with the CONFIG.SYS COUNTRY directive and the NLSFUNC driver. Likewise, the PC DOS and DR-DOS system files IBMBIO.COM and IBMDOS.COM are special binary images loaded by bootstrap loaders, not COM-style programs. Trying to load COUNTRY.SYS with a DEVICE statement or executing IBMBIO.COM or IBMDOS.COM at the command prompt will cause unpredictable results. (Note: This is the reason why these files have the hidden attribute set, so that they are not listed by default, thereby reducing the risk of being invoked accidentally.)

It is sometimes possible to avoid this by utilizing techniques similar to those described above. For example, DR-DOS 7.02 and higher incorporate a safety feature developed by Matthias R. Paul: If these files are called inappropriately, tiny embedded stubs will just display some file version information and exit gracefully. Additionally, the message is specifically crafted to follow certain "magic" patterns recognized by the external NetWare & DR-DOS VERSION file identification utility. (Note: The COUNTRY.SYS file formats supported by the MS-DOS/PC DOS and the DR-DOS families of operating systems contain similar data but are organized differently and incompatible. Since the entry points into the data structures are at different offsets in the file it is possible to create "fat" COUNTRY.SYS databases, which could be used under both DOS families.^{[b]} However, DR-DOS 7.02 and its NLSFUNC 4.00 (and higher) include an improved parser capable of reading both types of formats (and variants), even at the same time, so that Janus-headed files are not necessary.^{[c]}^{[d]} The shipped files are nevertheless "fat" for including a tiny executable stub just displaying an embedded message when invoked inappropriately.^{[d]}^{[b]})

A similar protection feature was the 8080 instruction C7h ("RST 0") at the very start of Jay Sage's and Joe Wright's Z-System type-3 and type-4 "Z3ENV" programs as well as "Z3TXT" language overlay files, which would result in a warm boot (instead of a crash) under CP/M-80 if loaded inappropriately.

In a distantly similar fashion, many (binary) file formats by convention include a 1Ah byte (ASCII ^Z) near the beginning of the file. This control character will be interpreted as "soft" end-of-file (EOF) marker when a file is opened in non-binary mode, and thus, under many operating systems (including the PDP-6 monitor and RT-11, VMS, TOPS-10, CP/M, DOS, and Windows), it prevents "binary garbage" from being displayed when a file is accidentally printed at the console.

== Linux ==
=== FatELF: Universal binaries for Linux ===
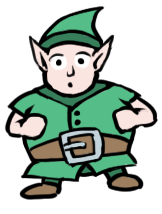
FatELF logo

FatELF was a fat binary implementation for Linux and other Unix-like operating systems. Technically, a FatELF binary was a concatenation of ELF binaries with some meta data indicating which binary to use on what architecture. Additionally to the CPU architecture abstraction (byte order, word size, CPU instruction set, etc.), there is the advantage of binaries with support for multiple kernel ABIs and versions.

FatELF has several use-cases, according to developers:

- Distributions no longer need to have separate downloads for various platforms.
- Separated /lib, /lib32 and /lib64 trees are not required anymore in OS directory structure.
- The correct binary and libraries are centrally chosen by the system instead of shell scripts.
- If the ELF ABI changes someday, legacy users can be still supported.
- Distribution of web browser plugins that work out of the box with multiple platforms.
- Distribution of one application file that works across Linux and BSD OS variants, without a platform compatibility layer on them.
- One hard drive partition can be booted on different machines with different CPU architectures, for development and experimentation. Same root file system, different kernel and CPU architecture.
- Applications provided by network share or USB sticks, will work on multiple systems. This is also helpful for creating portable applications and also cloud computing images for heterogeneous systems.

A proof-of-concept Ubuntu 9.04 image is available. As of 2021, FatELF has not been integrated into the mainline Linux kernel.

== Windows ==
=== Fatpack ===
Although the Portable Executable format used by Windows does not allow assigning code to platforms, it is still possible to make a loader program that dispatches based on architecture. This is because desktop versions of Windows on ARM have support for 32-bit x86 emulation, making it a useful "universal" machine code target. Fatpack is a loader that demonstrates the concept: it includes a 32-bit x86 program that tries to run the executables packed into its resource sections one by one.

=== Arm64X ===
When developing Windows 11 ARM64, Microsoft introduced a new way to extend the Portable Executable format called Arm64X. An Arm64X binary contains all the content that would be in separate x64/Arm64EC and Arm64 binaries, but merged into one more efficient file on disk. Visual C++ toolset has been upgraded to support producing such binaries. And when building Arm64X binaries are technically difficult, developers can build Arm64X pure forwarder DLLs instead.

== Similar concepts ==
The following approaches are similar to fat binaries in that multiple versions of machine code of the same purpose are provided in the same file.

=== Heterogeneous computing ===
Since 2007, some specialized compilers for heterogeneous platforms produce code files for parallel execution on multiple types of processors, i.e. the CHI (C for Heterogeneous Integration) compiler from the Intel EXOCHI (Exoskeleton Sequencer) development suite extends the OpenMP pragma concept for multithreading to produce fat binaries containing code sections for different instruction set architectures (ISAs) from which the runtime loader can dynamically initiate the parallel execution on multiple available CPU and GPU cores in a heterogeneous system environment.

Introduced in 2006, Nvidia's parallel computing platform CUDA (Compute Unified Device Architecture) is a software to enable general-purpose computing on GPUs (GPGPU). Its LLVM-based compiler NVCC can create ELF-based fat binaries containing so called PTX virtual assembly (as text) which the CUDA runtime driver can later just-in-time compile into some SASS (Streaming Assembler) binary executable code for the actually present target GPU. The executables can also include so called CUDA binaries (aka cubin files) containing dedicated executable code sections for one or more specific GPU architectures from which the CUDA runtime can choose from at load-time. Fat binaries are also supported by GPGPU-Sim, a GPU simulator introduced in 2007 as well.

Multi2Sim (M2S), an OpenCL heterogeneous system simulator framework (originally only for either MIPS or x86 CPUs, but later extended to also support ARM CPUs and GPUs like the AMD/ATI Evergreen & Southern Islands as well as Nvidia Fermi & Kepler families) supports ELF-based fat binaries as well.

=== Fat objects ===
GNU Compiler Collection (GCC) and LLVM do not have a fat binary format, but they do have fat object files for link-time optimization (LTO). Since LTO involves delaying the compilation to link-time, the object files must store the intermediate representation (IR), but on the other hand machine code may need to be stored too (for speed or compatibility). An LTO object containing both IR and machine code is known as a fat object.

=== Function multi-versioning ===
Even in a program or library intended for the same instruction set architecture, a programmer may wish to make use of some newer instruction set extensions while keeping compatibility with an older CPU. This can be achieved with function multi-versioning (FMV): versions of the same function are written into the program, and a piece of code decides which one to use by detecting the CPU's capabilities (such as through CPUID). Intel C++ Compiler, GCC, and LLVM all have the ability to automatically generate multi-versioned functions. This is a form of dynamic dispatch without any semantic effects.

Many math libraries feature hand-written assembly routines that are automatically chosen according to CPU capability. Examples include glibc, Intel MKL, and OpenBLAS. In addition, the library loader in glibc supports loading from alternative paths for specific CPU features.

A similar, but byte-level granular approach originally devised by Matthias R. Paul and Axel C. Frinke is to let a small self-discarding, relaxing and relocating loader embedded into the executable file alongside any number of alternative binary code snippets conditionally build a size- or speed-optimized runtime image of a program or driver necessary to perform (or not perform) a particular function in a particular target environment at load-time through a form of dynamic dead-code elimination (DDCE).

== See also ==
- Cross-platform software
- DOS stub
- Fat pointer
- Linear Executable (LX)
- New Executable (NE)
- Portable Executable (PE)
- Position-independent code (PIC)
- Side effect
- Universal hex format, a "fat" hex file format targeting multiple platforms
- Alphanumeric executable, executable code camouflaged as (sometimes even readable) text
- Multi-architecture shellcode, shellcode targeting multiple platforms (and sometimes even camouflaged as alphanumeric text)
