= Comparison of executable file formats =

This is a comparison of binary executable file formats which, once loaded by a suitable executable loader, can be directly executed by the CPU rather than being interpreted by software. In addition to the binary application code, the executables may contain headers and tables with relocation and fixup information as well as various kinds of meta data. Among those formats listed, the ones in most common use are PE (on Microsoft Windows), ELF (on Linux and most other versions of Unix), Mach-O (on macOS and iOS) and MZ (on DOS).

Format name	Operating system	Filename extension	Explicit processor declarations	Arbitrary sections	Metadata (Note: Metadata is casually used to describe the controlling data used in software architectures that are more abstract or configurable. Most executable file formats include what may be termed "metadata" that specifies certain, usually configurable, behavioral runtime characteristics. However, it is difficult if not impossible to precisely distinguish program "metadata" from general aspects of stored-program computing architecture; if the machine reads it and acts on it, it is a computational instruction, and the prefix "meta" has little significance. In Java, the Java class file format contains metadata used by the Java compiler and the Java virtual machine to dynamically link classes and to support reflective programming (reflection). The Java Platform, Standard Edition since J2SE 5.0 has included a metadata facility to allow additional annotations that are used by development tools. In DOS, the COM file format does not normally include metadata, while the EXE file and Windows Portable Executable (PE) formats do. These metadata can include the company that published the program, the date the program was created, the version number, and more. In the .NET framework executable format, extra metadata is included to allow reflection at runtime.)	Digital signature	String table	Symbol table	64-bit	Fat binaries	Can contain icon
ELF	Unix-like, OpenVMS, BeOS from R4 onwards, Haiku, SerenityOS	none	Yes by file	Yes	Yes	Extension	Yes	Yes	Yes	Extension	Extension
PE	Windows, ReactOS, HX DOS Extender, BeOS (R3 only)	.EXE	Yes by file	Yes	Yes	Yes	Yes	Yes	No	Only MZ (DOS)	Yes
PE32+	Windows (64-bit editions only)	.EXE	Yes by file	Yes	Yes	Yes	Yes	Yes	Yes	"Compiled Hybrid Portable Executable"	Yes
Mach-O	NeXTSTEP, macOS, iOS, iPadOS, watchOS, tvOS, visionOS	none	Yes by file or subfile of a multi-architecture binary	Some (limited to max. 256 sections)	Yes	Yes	Yes	Yes	Yes	Yes (multi-architecture binary)	No
OS/360	OS/360 and successors, and VS/9, mainframe operating systems	none	No	No	No	No	No	Yes	Yes	No	No
GOFF	IBM MVS and z/OS mainframe operating systems	none	No	No	Yes	No	Yes	Yes	Yes	No	No
a.out	Unix-like	none	No	No	No	No	Yes	Yes	Extension	No	No
COFF	Unix-like	none	Yes by file	Yes	No	No	Yes	Yes	Extension	No	No
ECOFF	Ultrix, Tru64 UNIX, IRIX	none	Yes by file	Yes	No	No	Yes	Yes	Yes	No	No
XCOFF	IBM AIX, BeOS, "classic" Mac OS	none	Yes by file	Yes	No	No	Yes	Yes	Yes	No	No
SOM	HP-UX, MPE/ix	?	Unknown	Unknown	No	No	Unknown	Yes	No	Unknown	No
Amiga Hunk	AmigaOS	none	No	Yes	Yes	No	No	Yes	No	Yes	No
PEF	"classic" Mac OS, BeOS (PPC only)	none	Yes by file	No	No	No	Yes	Yes	No	No	No
CMD	CP/M-86, MP/M-86, Concurrent CP/M-86, Personal CP/M-86, S5-DOS, Concurrent DOS, Concurrent DOS 286, FlexOS, S5-DOS/ST, S5-DOS/MT, Concurrent DOS 386, Multiuser DOS, System Manager, REAL/32, DOS Plus	.CMD	No (x86 only)	Yes	No	No	Extension	Extension	No	No	No
FlexOS 186	FlexOS 186, FlexOS 286, S5-DOS/ST, S5-DOS/MT, 4680 OS, FlexOS 386, 4690 OS	.186	No (186/188 and higher only)	Yes	No	No	Extension	Extension	No	No	No
FlexOS 286	FlexOS 286, S5-DOS/ST, S5-DOS/MT, 4680 OS, FlexOS 386, 4690 OS	.286	No (286 and higher only)	Yes	No	No	Extension	Extension	No	No	No
CP/M-68K	CP/M-68K, Concurrent DOS 68K, FlexOS 68K	.68K	No (68000 and higher only)	Yes	No	No	Unknown	Unknown	No	No	No
COM (CP/M)	CP/M, MP/M, Concurrent CP/M, Personal CP/M	.COM	No (8080/Z80 only)	Extension (BDOS 3 and higher only)	No	No	No	No	No	Extension	No
COM (DOS)	DOS, OS/2, Windows (except for 64-bit editions), Concurrent CP/M-86 (BDOS 3.1 only), Concurrent DOS, Concurrent DOS 286, FlexOS, Concurrent DOS 386, Multiuser DOS, System Manager, REAL/32, DOS Plus	.COM	No (x86 only)	No	Extension (Novell/Caldera VERSION etc.)	No	No	No	Extension	Extension	No
MZ (DOS)	DOS, OS/2, Windows (except for 64-bit editions), Concurrent DOS 286, FlexOS, Concurrent DOS 386, Multiuser DOS, System Manager, REAL/32, DOS Plus	.EXE	No (x86 only)	Yes	Extension (Novell/Caldera VERSION etc.)	No	Extension	Extension	Extension	No	No
MZ (GEM)	GEM, ViewMAX	.APP/.ACC	No (x86 only)	Yes	No	No	Unknown	Unknown	No	No	Unknown
NE	MS-DOS 4.0 (multitasking), OS/2, Windows, HX DOS Extender	.EXE	No (x86 only)	Yes	Yes	No	No	Yes	No	Only MZ (DOS)	Yes
LE, (W3, W4)	OS/2 (2.0 and higher only), some DOS extenders	.EXE	Yes by file (286 and higher only)	Yes	Yes	No	Yes	Yes	No	No	Yes
LX	OS/2 (2.0 and higher only), some 32-bit DOS extenders	.EXE	Yes by file	Yes	Yes	No	Yes	Yes	No	No	Yes
PIM/XIP	PalmDOS (MINIMAX applications only)	.PIM/.XIP	No (x86 only)	Yes	No	No	No	No	No	No	No
DL	MS-DOS System Manager applications (HP LX series only)	.EXM	No (186/188 and higher only)	Yes	No	No	No	No	No	No	No
MP	Phar Lap DOS extenders	.EXP	Unknown (286 and higher only)	Yes	No	No	Unknown	Unknown	No	No	No
P2	Phar Lap 16-bit DOS extenders	.EXP	Unknown (286 and higher only)	Yes	No	No	Unknown	Unknown	No	No	No
P3	Phar Lap 32-bit DOS extenders	.EXP	Unknown (386 and higher only)	Yes	No	No	Unknown	Unknown	No	No	No
GEOS	PC/GEOS, Geoworks Ensemble, NewDeal Office, Breadbox Ensemble	.GEO	Unknown (x86 only)	Unknown	Unknown	No	Unknown	Unknown	No	No	Unknown
