= Preferred Executable Format =

Apple Computer file format for storing programs

- Uniform Type Identifier (UTI): com.apple.pef-binary
- Developed by: Apple Computer
- Type of format: executable
- Container for: PowerPC executable and object code

The Preferred Executable Format is a file format that specifies the format of executable files and other object code. PEF executables are also called Code Fragment Manager files (CFM).

PEF was developed by Apple Computer for use in its classic Mac OS operating system. It was optimized for RISC processors. In macOS, the Mach-O file format is the native executable format. However, PEF was still supported on PowerPC-based Macintoshes running Mac OS X and was used by some Carbon applications ported from earlier versions for classic Mac OS, so that the same binary could be run on classic Mac OS and Mac OS X.

BeOS on PowerPC systems also uses PEF, although x86 systems do not.

== See also ==
- Comparison of executable file formats
- Fat binary
