= XCOFF =

File format

- Filename extension: none, .o
- Developed by: IBM
- Type of format: Binary, executable, object, shared libraries
- Extended from: COFF

XCOFF (Extended Common Object File Format) defined by IBM and used in AIX, is an improved and expanded version of the COFF (Common Object File Format) object file format.

== Object file format ==
Early versions of the PowerPC Macintosh also supported XCOFF, as did BeOS.

XCOFF additions include the use of CSECTs to provide subsection granularity of cross-references, and the use of stabs for debugging. Information for the handling of shared libraries is also more elaborate than for plain COFF.

More recently, IBM defined an XCOFF64 version supporting 64-bit AIX, and used XCOFF32 to mean the original file format.

== See also ==
- Comparison of executable file formats
