= Executable and Linkable Format =

Standard file format for executables, object code, shared libraries, and core dumps

- Filename extension: none, .axf, .bin, .elf, .o, .out, .prx, .puff, .ko, .mod, .AppImage and .so
- Magic number: 0x7F 'E' 'L' 'F'
- Developed by: Unix System Laboratories
- Initial release: 14 May 1998; 28 years ago
- Latest release: 4.2; 2025; 1 year ago
- Type of format: Binary, executable, object, shared library, core dump
- Container for: Many executable binary formats

An ELF file has two views: the program header shows the segments used at run time, where as the section header lists the set of sections.

In computing, the Executable and Linkable Format (ELF, formerly named Extensible Linking Format) is a common standard file format for executable files, object code, shared libraries, device drivers, and core dumps. First published in the specification for the application binary interface (ABI) of the Unix operating system version named System V Release 4 (SVR4), and later in the Tool Interface Standard, it was quickly accepted among different vendors of Unix systems. In 1999, it was chosen as the standard binary file format for Unix and Unix-like systems on x86 processors by the 86open project.

By design, the ELF format is flexible, extensible, and cross-platform. For instance, it supports different endiannesses and address sizes so it does not exclude any particular CPU or instruction set architecture. This has allowed it to be adopted by many different operating systems on many different hardware platforms.

== File layout ==
Each ELF file is made up of one ELF header, followed by file data. The data can include:

- Program header table, describing zero or more memory segments
- Section header table, describing zero or more sections
- Data referred to by entries in the program header table or section header table

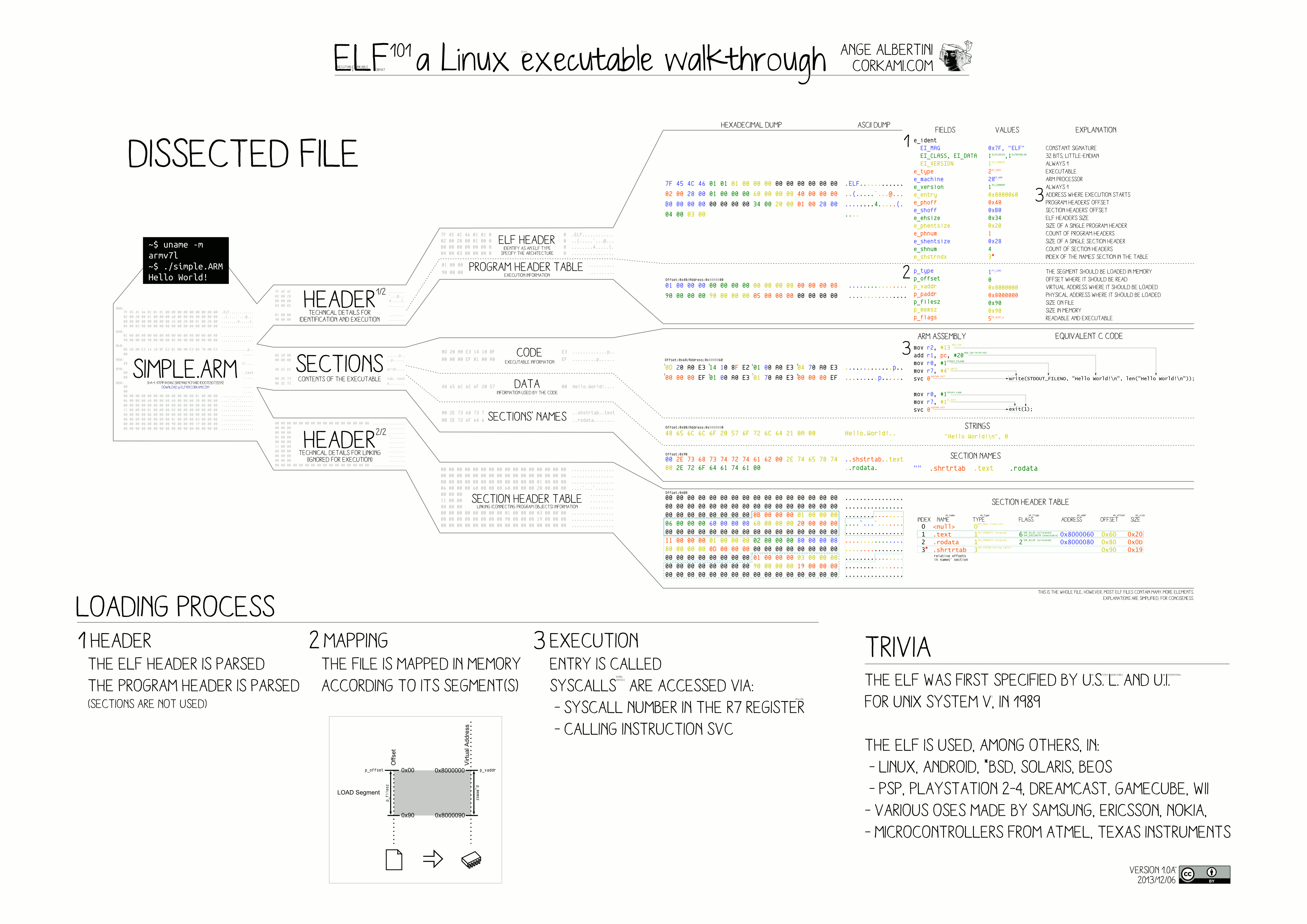
Structure of an ELF file with key entries highlighted

The segments contain information that is needed for run time execution of the file, while sections contain important data for linking and relocation. Any byte in the entire file can be owned by one section at most, and orphan bytes can occur which are unowned by any section.

=== ELF header ===
The ELF header defines whether to use 32-bit or 64-bit addresses. The header contains three fields that are affected by this setting and offset other fields that follow them. The ELF header is 52 or 64 bytes long for 32-bit and 64-bit binaries, respectively.

ELF header
Offset		Size (bytes)		Field	Purpose
32-bit	64-bit	32-bit	64-bit	Field	Purpose
0x00		4		e_ident[EI_MAG0] through e_ident[EI_MAG3]	0x7F followed by ELF(45 4c 46) in ASCII; these four bytes constitute the magic number.
0x04		1		e_ident[EI_CLASS]	This byte is set to either 1 or 2 to signify 32- or 64-bit format, respectively.
0x05		1		e_ident[EI_DATA]	This byte is set to either 1 or 2 to signify little or big endianness, respectively. This affects interpretation of multi-byte fields starting with offset 0x10.
0x06		1		e_ident[EI_VERSION]	Set to 1 for the original and current version of ELF.
0x07		1		e_ident[EI_OSABI]	Identifies the target operating system ABI.: Value / ABI; 0x00 / System V; 0x01 / HP-UX; 0x02 / NetBSD; 0x03 / Linux; 0x04 / GNU Hurd; 0x06 / Solaris; 0x07 / AIX (Monterey); 0x08 / IRIX; 0x09 / FreeBSD; 0x0A / Tru64; 0x0B / Novell Modesto; 0x0C / OpenBSD; 0x0D / OpenVMS; 0x0E / NonStop Kernel; 0x0F / AROS; 0x10 / FenixOS; 0x11 / Nuxi CloudABI; 0x12 / Stratus Technologies OpenVOS
0x08		1		e_ident[EI_ABIVERSION]	Further specifies the ABI version. Its interpretation depends on the target ABI. Linux kernel (after at least 2.6) has no definition of it, so it is ignored for statically linked executables. In that case, offset and size of EI_PAD are 8. glibc 2.12+ in case e_ident[EI_OSABI] == 3 treats this field as ABI version of the dynamic linker: it defines a list of dynamic linker's features, treats e_ident[EI_ABIVERSION] as a feature level requested by the shared object (executable or dynamic library) and refuses to load it if an unknown feature is requested, i.e. e_ident[EI_ABIVERSION] is greater than the largest known feature.
0x09		7		e_ident[EI_PAD]	Reserved padding bytes. Currently unused. Should be filled with zeros and ignored when read.
0x10		2		e_type	Identifies object file type.: Value / Type / Meaning; 0x00 / ET_NONE / Unknown.; 0x01 / ET_REL / Relocatable file.; 0x02 / ET_EXEC / Executable file.; 0x03 / ET_DYN / Shared object.; 0x04 / ET_CORE / Core file.; 0xFE00 / ET_LOOS / Reserved inclusive range. Operating system specific.; 0xFEFF / ET_HIOS / Reserved inclusive range. Operating system specific.; 0xFF00 / ET_LOPROC / Reserved inclusive range. Processor specific.; 0xFFFF / ET_HIPROC / Reserved inclusive range. Processor specific.
0x12		2		e_machine	Specifies target instruction set architecture. Some examples are: Value / ISA; 0x00 / No specific instruction set; 0x01 / AT&T WE 32100; 0x02 / SPARC; 0x03 / x86; 0x04 / Motorola 68000 (M68k); 0x05 / Motorola 88000 (M88k); 0x06 / Intel MCU; 0x07 / Intel 80860; 0x08 / MIPS; 0x09 / IBM System/370; 0x0A / MIPS RS3000 Little-endian; 0x0B – 0x0E / Reserved for future use; 0x0F / Hewlett-Packard PA-RISC; 0x13 / Intel 80960; 0x14 / PowerPC; 0x15 / PowerPC (64-bit); 0x16 / S390, including S390x; 0x17 / IBM SPU/SPC; 0x18 – 0x23 / Reserved for future use; 0x24 / NEC V800; 0x25 / Fujitsu FR20; 0x26 / TRW RH-32; 0x27 / Motorola RCE; 0x28 / Arm (up to Armv7/AArch32); 0x29 / Digital Alpha; 0x2A / SuperH; 0x2B / SPARC Version 9; 0x2C / Siemens TriCore embedded processor; 0x2D / Argonaut RISC Core; 0x2E / Hitachi H8/300; 0x2F / Hitachi H8/300H; 0x30 / Hitachi H8S; 0x31 / Hitachi H8/500; 0x32 / IA-64; 0x33 / Stanford MIPS-X; 0x34 / Motorola ColdFire; 0x35 / Motorola M68HC12; 0x36 / Fujitsu MMA Multimedia Accelerator; 0x37 / Siemens PCP; 0x38 / Sony nCPU embedded RISC processor; 0x39 / Denso NDR1 microprocessor; 0x3A / Motorola Star*Core processor; 0x3B / Toyota ME16 processor; 0x3C / STMicroelectronics ST100 processor; 0x3D / Advanced Logic Corp. TinyJ embedded processor family; 0x3E / AMD x86-64; 0x3F / Sony DSP Processor; 0x40 / Digital Equipment Corp. PDP-10; 0x41 / Digital Equipment Corp. PDP-11; 0x42 / Siemens FX66 microcontroller; 0x43 / STMicroelectronics ST9+ 8/16-bit microcontroller; 0x44 / STMicroelectronics ST7 8-bit microcontroller; 0x45 / Motorola MC68HC16 Microcontroller; 0x46 / Motorola MC68HC11 Microcontroller; 0x47 / Motorola MC68HC08 Microcontroller; 0x48 / Motorola MC68HC05 Microcontroller; 0x49 / Silicon Graphics SVx; 0x4A / STMicroelectronics ST19 8-bit microcontroller; 0x4B / Digital VAX; 0x4C / Axis Communications 32-bit embedded processor; 0x4D / Infineon Technologies 32-bit embedded processor; 0x4E / Element 14 64-bit DSP Processor; 0x4F / LSI Logic 16-bit DSP Processor; 0x8C / TMS320C6000 Family; 0xAF / MCST Elbrus e2k; 0xB7 / Arm 64-bits (Armv8/AArch64); 0xDC / Zilog Z80; 0xF3 / RISC-V; 0xF7 / Berkeley Packet Filter; 0x101 / WDC 65C816; 0x102 / LoongArch
0x14		4		e_version	Set to 1 for the original version of ELF.
0x18		4	8	e_entry	This is the memory address of the entry point from where the process starts executing. This field is either 32 or 64 bits long, depending on the format defined earlier (byte 0x04). If the file doesn't have an associated entry point, then this holds zero.
0x1C	0x20	4	8	e_phoff	Points to the start of the program header table. It usually follows the file header immediately following this one, making the offset 0x34 or 0x40 for 32- and 64-bit ELF executables, respectively.
0x20	0x28	4	8	e_shoff	Points to the start of the section header table.
0x24	0x30	4		e_flags	Interpretation of this field depends on the target architecture.
0x28	0x34	2		e_ehsize	Contains the size of this header, normally 64 Bytes for 64-bit and 52 Bytes for 32-bit format.
0x2A	0x36	2		e_phentsize	Contains the size of a program header table entry. As explained below, this will typically be 0x20 (32-bit) or 0x38 (64-bit).
0x2C	0x38	2		e_phnum	Contains the number of entries in the program header table.
0x2E	0x3A	2		e_shentsize	Contains the size of a section header table entry. As explained below, this will typically be 0x28 (32-bit) or 0x40 (64-bit).
0x30	0x3C	2		e_shnum	Contains the number of entries in the section header table.
0x32	0x3E	2		e_shstrndx	Contains index of the section header table entry that contains the section names.
0x34	0x40				End of ELF Header (size).

=== Example hexdump ===
00000000  7f 45 4c 46 02 01 01 00  00 00 00 00 00 00 00 00  |.ELF............|
00000010  02 00 3e 00 01 00 00 00  c5 48 40 00 00 00 00 00  |..>......H@.....|

=== Program header ===
The program header table tells the operating system how to create a process image. It is found at file offset e_phoff, and consists of e_phnum entries, each with size e_phentsize. The layout is slightly different in 32-bit ELF vs 64-bit ELF, because the p_flags are in a different structure location for alignment reasons. Each entry is structured as:

Program header
Offset		Size (bytes)		Field	Purpose
32-bit	64-bit	32-bit	64-bit	Field	Purpose
0x00		4		p_type	Identifies the type of the segment.: Value / Name / Meaning; 0x00000000 / PT_NULL / Program header table entry unused.; 0x00000001 / PT_LOAD / Loadable segment.; 0x00000002 / PT_DYNAMIC / Dynamic linking information.; 0x00000003 / PT_INTERP / Interpreter information.; 0x00000004 / PT_NOTE / Auxiliary information.; 0x00000005 / PT_SHLIB / Reserved.; 0x00000006 / PT_PHDR / Segment containing program header table itself.; 0x00000007 / PT_TLS / Thread-Local Storage template.; 0x60000000 / PT_LOOS / Reserved inclusive range. Operating system specific.; 0x6FFFFFFF / PT_HIOS / Reserved inclusive range. Operating system specific.; 0x70000000 / PT_LOPROC / Reserved inclusive range. Processor specific.; 0x7FFFFFFF / PT_HIPROC / Reserved inclusive range. Processor specific.
	0x04		4	p_flags	Segment-dependent flags (position for 64-bit structure).: Value / Name / Meaning; 0x1 / PF_X / Executable segment.; 0x2 / PF_W / Writeable segment.; 0x4 / PF_R / Readable segment.
0x04	0x08	4	8	p_offset	Offset of the segment in the file image.
0x08	0x10	4	8	p_vaddr	Virtual address of the segment in memory.
0x0C	0x18	4	8	p_paddr	On systems where physical address is relevant, reserved for segment's physical address.
0x10	0x20	4	8	p_filesz	Size in bytes of the segment in the file image. May be 0.
0x14	0x28	4	8	p_memsz	Size in bytes of the segment in memory. May be 0.
0x18		4		p_flags	Segment-dependent flags (position for 32-bit structure). See above p_flags field for flag definitions.
0x1C	0x30	4	8	p_align	0 and 1 specify no alignment. Otherwise should be a positive, integral power of 2, with p_vaddr equating p_offset, modulus p_align (expr. p_vaddr % p_align == p_offset % p_align).
0x20	0x38				End of Program Header (size).

=== Section header ===
The section header table lists all of the ELF file's sections. It is found at file offset e_shoff, and consists of e_shnum entries, each with size e_shentsize. Each entry is structured as:

Section header
Offset		Size (bytes)		Field	Purpose
32-bit	64-bit	32-bit	64-bit	Field	Purpose
0x00		4		sh_name	An offset to a string in the .shstrtab section that represents the name of this section.
0x04		4		sh_type	Identifies the type of this header.: Value / Name / Meaning; 0x0 / SHT_NULL / Section header table entry unused; 0x1 / SHT_PROGBITS / Program data; 0x2 / SHT_SYMTAB / Symbol table; 0x3 / SHT_STRTAB / String table; 0x4 / SHT_RELA / Relocation entries with addends; 0x5 / SHT_HASH / Symbol hash table; 0x6 / SHT_DYNAMIC / Dynamic linking information; 0x7 / SHT_NOTE / Notes; 0x8 / SHT_NOBITS / Program space with no data (bss); 0x9 / SHT_REL / Relocation entries, no addends; 0x0A / SHT_SHLIB / Reserved; 0x0B / SHT_DYNSYM / Dynamic linker symbol table; 0x0E / SHT_INIT_ARRAY / Array of constructors; 0x0F / SHT_FINI_ARRAY / Array of destructors; 0x10 / SHT_PREINIT_ARRAY / Array of pre-constructors; 0x11 / SHT_GROUP / Section group; 0x12 / SHT_SYMTAB_SHNDX / Extended section indices; 0x13 / SHT_NUM / Number of defined types.; 0x60000000 / SHT_LOOS / Start OS-specific.; ... / ... / ...
0x08		4	8	sh_flags	Identifies the attributes of the section.: Value / Name / Meaning; 0x1 / SHF_WRITE / Writable; 0x2 / SHF_ALLOC / Occupies memory during execution; 0x4 / SHF_EXECINSTR / Executable; 0x10 / SHF_MERGE / Might be merged; 0x20 / SHF_STRINGS / Contains null-terminated strings; 0x40 / SHF_INFO_LINK / sh_info contains SHT index; 0x80 / SHF_LINK_ORDER / Preserve order after combining; 0x100 / SHF_OS_NONCONFORMING / Non-standard OS specific handling required; 0x200 / SHF_GROUP / Section is member of a group; 0x400 / SHF_TLS / Section holds thread-local data; 0x0FF00000 / SHF_MASKOS / OS-specific; 0xF0000000 / SHF_MASKPROC / Processor-specific; 0x4000000 / SHF_ORDERED / Special ordering requirement (Solaris); 0x8000000 / SHF_EXCLUDE / Section is excluded unless referenced or allocated (Solaris)
0x0C	0x10	4	8	sh_addr	Virtual address of the section in memory, for sections that are loaded.
0x10	0x18	4	8	sh_offset	Offset of the section in the file image.
0x14	0x20	4	8	sh_size	Size of the section in bytes. May be 0.
0x18	0x28	4		sh_link	Contains the section index of an associated section. This field is used for several purposes, depending on the type of section.
0x1C	0x2C	4		sh_info	Contains extra information about the section. This field is used for several purposes, depending on the type of section.
0x20	0x30	4	8	sh_addralign	Contains the required alignment of the section. This field must be a power of two.
0x24	0x38	4	8	sh_entsize	Contains the size— in bytes— of each entry, for sections that contain fixed-size entries. Otherwise, this field contains zero.
0x28	0x40				End of Section Header (size).

== Tools ==
- readelf is a Unix binary utility that displays information about one or more ELF files. A free software implementation is provided by GNU Binutils.
- elfutils provides alternative tools to GNU Binutils purely for Linux.
- elfdump is a command for viewing ELF information in an ELF file, available under Solaris and FreeBSD.
- objdump provides a wide range of information about ELF files and other object formats. objdump uses the Binary File Descriptor library as a back-end to structure the ELF data.
- The Unix file utility can display some information about ELF files, including the instruction set architecture for which the code in a relocatable, executable, or shared object file is intended, or on which an ELF core dump was produced.

== Applications ==
=== Unix-like systems ===
The ELF format has replaced older executable formats in various environments. It has replaced a.out and COFF formats in Unix-like operating systems:

- Linux
- Solaris / Illumos
- IRIX
- FreeBSD
- NetBSD
- OpenBSD
- Redox
- DragonFly BSD
- Syllable
- HP-UX (except for 32-bit PA-RISC programs which continue to use SOM)
- QNX Neutrino
- MINIX

=== Non-Unix adoption ===
ELF has also seen some adoption in non-Unix operating systems, such as:

- OpenVMS, in its Itanium and amd64 versions
- BeOS Revision 4 and later for x86 based computers (where it replaced the Portable Executable format; the PowerPC version stayed with Preferred Executable Format)
- Haiku, an open source reimplementation of BeOS
- RISC OS
- Stratus VOS, in PA-RISC and x86 versions
- SkyOS
- Fuchsia OS
- Z/TPF
- HPE NonStop OS
- Deos

Microsoft Windows also uses the ELF format, but only for its Windows Subsystem for Linux compatibility system.

=== Game consoles ===
Some game consoles also use ELF:

- PlayStation Portable, PlayStation Vita, PlayStation, PlayStation 2, PlayStation 3, PlayStation 4, PlayStation 5
- GP2X
- Dreamcast
- GameCube
- Nintendo 64
- Wii
- Wii U

=== PowerPC ===
Other (operating) systems running on PowerPC that use ELF:

- AmigaOS 4, the ELF executable has replaced the prior Extended Hunk Format (EHF) which was used on Amigas equipped with PPC processor expansion cards.
- MorphOS
- AROS
- Café OS (The operating system run by the Wii U)

=== Mobile phones ===
Some operating systems for mobile phones and mobile devices use ELF:

- Symbian OS v9 uses E32Image format that is based on the ELF file format;
- Sony Ericsson, for example, the W800i, W610, W300, etc.
- Siemens, the SGOLD and SGOLD2 platforms: from Siemens C65 to S75 and BenQ-Siemens E71/EL71;
- Motorola, for example, the E398, SLVR L7, v360, v3i (and all phone LTE2 which has the patch applied).
- Bada, for example, the Samsung Wave S8500.
- Nokia phones or tablets running the Maemo or the Meego OS, for example, the Nokia N900.
- Android uses ELF .so (shared object) libraries for the Java Native Interface. With Android Runtime (ART), the default since Android 5.0 "Lollipop", all applications are compiled into native ELF binaries on installation. It's also possible to use native Linux software from package managers like Termux, or compile them from sources via Clang or GCC, that are available in repositories.

Some phones can run ELF files through the use of a patch that adds assembly code to the main firmware, which is a feature known as ELFPack in the underground modding culture. The ELF file format is also used with the Atmel AVR (8-bit), AVR32 and with Texas Instruments MSP430 microcontroller architectures. Some implementations of Open Firmware can also load ELF files, most notably Apple's implementation used in almost all PowerPC machines the company produced.

=== Blockchain platforms ===
- Solana uses ELF format for its on-chain programs (smart contracts). The platform processes ELF files compiled to BPF (Berkeley Packet Filter) byte-code, which are then deployed as shared objects and executed in Solana's runtime environment. The BPF loader validates and processes these ELF files during program deployment.

== Specifications ==
Architecture	Specification
Generic	System V Application Binary Interface Edition 4.1 (1997-03-18); System V ABI Update (October 2009)
AMD64	System V ABI, AMD64 Supplement
Arm	ELF for the ARM Architecture
IA-32	System V ABI, Intel386 Architecture Processor Supplement
IA-64	Itanium Software Conventions and Runtime Guide (September 2000)
M32R	M32R ELF ABI Supplement Version 1.2 (2004-08-26)
MIPS	System V ABI, MIPS RISC Processor Supplement; MIPS EABI documentation (2003-06-11)
Motorola 6800	Motorola 8- and 16- bit Embedded ABI
PA-RISC	ELF Supplement for PA-RISC Version 1.43 (October 6, 1997)
PowerPC	System V ABI, PPC Supplement; PowerPC Embedded Application Binary Interface 32-Bit Implementation (1995-10-01); 64-bit PowerPC ELF Application Binary Interface Supplement Version 1.9 (2004)
RISC-V	RISC-V ELF Specification
SPARC	System V ABI, SPARC Supplement
S/390	S/390 32bit ELF ABI Supplement
zSeries	zSeries 64bit ELF ABI Supplement
Symbian OS 9	E32Image file format on Symbian OS 9

The Linux Standard Base (LSB) supplements some of the above specifications for architectures in which it is specified. For example, that is the case for the System V ABI, AMD64 Supplement.

== 86open ==
86open was a project to form consensus on a common binary file format for Unix and Unix-like operating systems on the common PC compatible x86 architecture, to encourage software developers to port to the architecture. The initial idea was to standardize on a small subset of Spec 1170, a predecessor of the Single UNIX Specification, and the GNU C Library (glibc) to enable unmodified binaries to run on the x86 Unix-like operating systems. The project was originally designated "Spec 150".

The format eventually chosen was ELF, specifically the Linux implementation of ELF, after it had turned out to be a de facto standard supported by all involved vendors and operating systems.

The group began email discussions in 1997 and first met together at the Santa Cruz Operation offices on August 22, 1997.

The steering committee was Marc Ewing, Dion Johnson, Evan Leibovitch, Bruce Perens, Andrew Roach, Bryan Wayne Sparks and Linus Torvalds. Other people on the project were Keith Bostic, Chuck Cranor, Michael Davidson, Chris G. Demetriou, Ulrich Drepper, Don Dugger, Steve Ginzburg, Jon "maddog" Hall, Ron Holt, Jordan Hubbard, Dave Jensen, Kean Johnston, Andrew Josey, Robert Lipe, Bela Lubkin, Tim Marsland, Greg Page, Ronald Joe Record, Tim Ruckle, Joel Silverstein, Chia-pi Tien, and Erik Troan. Operating systems and companies represented were BeOS, BSDI, FreeBSD, Intel, Linux, NetBSD, SCO and SunSoft.

The project progressed and in mid-1998, SCO began developing lxrun, an open-source compatibility layer able to run Linux binaries on OpenServer, UnixWare, and Solaris. SCO announced official support of lxrun at LinuxWorld in March 1999. Sun Microsystems began officially supporting lxrun for Solaris in early 1999, and later moved to integrated support of the Linux binary format via Solaris Containers for Linux Applications.

With the BSDs having long supported Linux binaries (through a compatibility layer) and the main x86 Unix vendors having added support for the format, the project decided that Linux ELF was the format chosen by the industry and "declare[d] itself dissolved" on July 25, 1999.

== See also ==
- Application binary interface
- Comparison of executable file formats
- DWARF – a format for debugging data
- Intel Binary Compatibility Standard
- Portable Executable – format used by Windows
- vDSO – virtual DSO
- Position-independent code
