= Amiga Hunk =

Executable file format for AmigaOS

Hunk
- Developed by: Commodore International MetaComCo plc.
- Initial release: May 5, 1986; 39 years ago
- Type of format: Amiga executable

Hunk is the executable file format of tools and programs of the Amiga Operating System based on Motorola 68000 CPU and other processors of the same family. The file format was originally defined by MetaComCo. as part of TRIPOS, which formed the basis for AmigaDOS. This kind of executable got its name from the fact that the software programmed on Amiga is divided in its internal structure into many pieces called hunks, in which every portion could contain either code or data.

== Hunk structure ==
The hunks in an Amiga executable file could exist in various types. There are 32-bit hunks, 16-bit hunks, and even some 8-bit hunks.

Types of hunks were standardized in AmigaOS, and well documented in The AmigaDOS Manual edited by Commodore to explain to programmers how to code on the Amiga, during the years in which Commodore manufactured Amiga computers. Their structure was officially codified and could be changed only by a Commodore committee, which then communicated the modifications to the developers for new releases of the Amiga operating system.

The structure of an Amiga hunk is very simple: There is a header at the beginning of the hunk indicating that that kind of "portion of code" is a known and valid Amiga hunk type, then follows an ID which indicates the length of the hunk itself, and at the bottom is the segment of the hunk which contains the real code or data.

== Features of Amiga executable files ==
Amiga executable files can be launched either from the graphical shell of the Amiga, the Workbench or from the Amiga's command line interpreter (called CLI, later AmigaShell).

No particular filename extension is required for Amiga executable files. For example, the calculator applet "Calculator" can be renamed to "Calculator.com", "Calculator.exe", "Calculator.bin", or even "Calculator.jpeg". These are all valid names for programs or tools, because AmigaOS does not differentiate between filename extensions.

AmigaOS adopted another method to recognize it is dealing with a valid executable. There is a particular sequence of bytes in the file header, yielding the hexadecimal value $000003f3. This sequence, which signifies an executable file and lets it be self-running, is called a magic cookie (from the magic cookies in Alice's Adventures in Wonderland by Lewis Carroll).

This kind of solution to identify executables on the Amiga was taken from similar solutions which were adopted by UNIX/Unix-like operating systems, where magic cookies are called magic numbers.

== Structure of an Amiga executable file ==
The internal structure of an Amiga executable file is very simple. In the beginning of the file there is the magic cookie, then is declared the total number of hunks in the executable, and just after this is the progressive numbers of hunks starting from "0" (zero).

The first hunk is always numbered zero, so if the executable is (for example) subdivided into three hunks, they will be numbered "0" for the first one, "1" the second and "2" the third hunk, and so on.

Just before the real hunks start is a table containing information about the length of any hunks present in the executable, and in the last part of the file are positioned the real hunks, each one described by its type name: HUNK_CODE, HUNK_DATA, et cetera.

Representation of the structure:

Magic Cookie	Total number of hunks	Progressive number of hunks	Table of length	Various Hunks (Hunk_Code, Hunk_Data, etc.)

== Hunk Types ==
Known hunk types for the Amiga are:

Name	Value (decimal)	Value (hex)
HUNK_UNIT	999	3E7
HUNK_NAME	1000	3E8
HUNK_CODE	1001	3E9
HUNK_DATA	1002	3EA
HUNK_BSS	1003	3EB
HUNK_RELOC32	1004	3EC
HUNK_RELOC16	1005	3ED
HUNK_RELOC8	1006	3EE
HUNK_EXT	1007	3EF
HUNK_SYMBOL	1008	3F0
HUNK_DEBUG	1009	3F1
HUNK_END	1010	3F2
HUNK_HEADER	1011	3F3
HUNK_OVERLAY	1013	3F5
HUNK_BREAK	1014	3F6
HUNK_DREL32	1015	3F7
HUNK_DREL16	1016	3F8
HUNK_DREL8	1017	3F9
HUNK_LIB	1018	3FA
HUNK_INDEX	1019	3FB
HUNK_RELOC32SHORT	1020	3FC
HUNK_RELRELOC32	1021	3FD
HUNK_ABSRELOC16	1022	3FE
HUNK_PPC_CODE *	1257	4E9
HUNK_RELRELOC26 *	1260	4EC

* Extended Hunk Format

== Metadata ==
The Amiga could save metadata into hunks, as the hunk structure could be easily adapted to support this feature, but the hunk format of executables was abandoned in favour of ELF and there is no central authority (as the dismissed Commodore) which could implement this feature as one of the Amiga standards.

The Amiga saves some metadata into sidecar files known as ".info" (so called from the name of their extension suffix).

".info" files may be created any time a project (datafile) is saved on disk. Example: When user saves a file called "MyProject" two files may be created on disk called "MyProject" and MyProject.info".

The "MyProject" file contains the real data of the project file, while the "MyProject.info" file contains the icon, and the information regarding the software which originated the file, so any time the project icon is invoked by clicking on it with mouse, the parent software will be opened (users can change this information at any time, allowing other programs to believe they created the project file rather than the original software which physically created it).

Application Binding does not exist in AmigaOS as in other systems like MacOS.

The ".info" file also contains some particular characteristics of the project file and the user comments.

".info" files do not appear on the Workbench Screen (Workbench is the default Amiga Desktop GUI). On the desktop screen only the icon of the project file taken out of the "info" file appears. In fact the icon is the virtual medium that connects the project itself and the metadata stored into ".info".

When the user clicks on the icon with left mouse button, the project ".info" calls the program which originated it. When the user clicks on the icon and chooses the appropriate menu item, then a dialog box will appear, allowing the user to interact with metadata contained in the ".info" file.

The ".info" files are copied or moved together with their associated project file, by moving the icon with the mouse, and can be viewed as a standalone file through the command line interfaces of Amiga such as AmigaShell, or using third party filemanagers or directory listers like Directory Opus or DiskMaster.

If the ".info" file represents an executable program, then the ".info" file contains information about the stack of RAM buffers that could be reserved to the executable file (e.g. 4096, 8192 or 16384 or more bytes of RAM) and even the arguments that could be invoked by using a command line interface. For example, an Amiga program could open its own graphic user interface screen independent from the desktop screen. By invoking arguments such as "Screen=800x600" and "Depth=8" into the info file dialog box, the user can save this information into the associated ".info" file and then program would open the productivity software into its own screen sized 800×600 with 8 bits of colour depth (equal to 256 colors).

The user can also delete ".info" files, but then they will renounce the benefits of having an icon representing the project file on the desktop, and will also lose all the metadata contained in it.

=== Icons ===
A brief view of the bitmap icons contained into ".info" metadata files:

The icons are RAW bitmap data contained in ".info" files and are not standard Amiga IFF/LBM files. The users can deal with icons by using the AmigaOS standard program "IconEdit", present in the operating system since its early versions. Starting from AmigaOS version 2.0, IconEdit could import and save normal IFF/LBM files used as standard graphics files in AmigaOS.

Some Amiga programs like Personal Paint from Cloanto are able to view, load and save bitmap data as normal Amiga Icons or as Amiga ".info" files already existing.

Legacy Amiga Icons can have two-state icons, using two different bitmap images. The first bitmap contains the data of the "quiet" icon, also known as the "quiet state" of the icon. The second bitmap image contains data of the "selected" state of the icon. When the user clicks on an icon and activates it, then the quiet icon bitmap data is suddenly replaced by the selected icon bitmap data. Such behaviour gives the Amiga icons the effect of moving cartoons. In case this second bitmap does not exist in the ".info" file (it is not mandatory to create both bitmaps), then an inverse color effect is used when the icon is selected.

Third-party icon "engines" exist, which try to keep the look of AmigaOS up to date with modern standards of other Operating Systems. These programs patch the OS routines dedicated to icon handling, replacing them with custom ones. One of such attempts, NewIcons, has become almost the new de facto standard for AmigaOS 3.x. It was so popular that the new icon system used in AmigaOS 3.5 and above, GlowIcons, is based on its icon file format.

All modern Amiga-like operating systems (AmigaOS 4, MorphOS and AROS) could associate either RAW bitmap data, IFF/LBM files or also PNG files as standard internal bitmap image of any icon.

== Overlaid executables ==
The HUNK_OVERLAY type was intended to reduce the amount of RAM needed to run a program. Executables with an overlay structure have a root node which is in memory at all times, and the rest of the program is split into smaller modules which are loaded and unloaded automatically when needed.

The Overlay format works by adding little stubs to code so that when they branch into a sub-module, it calls an overlay manager, which loads the requisite module. Commodore defined a standard overlay manager so that C code could automatically have these stubs inserted, and also generate an overlay table, which the standard overlay manager knew how to read.

However, the Overlay format was rarely used, especially in the way it was intended. It was more commonly used with a custom overlay manager. A popular use of overlay format was with the Titanics Cruncher, which compressed executables. Instead of loading the entire compressed executable into memory before unpacking, the Titanics Cruncher used an overlay, so only a tiny decruncher was loaded into memory, then it read and decompressed data as it went.

== Other executable file formats used on Amiga ==
With third party add-ons AmigaOS up to 3.9 recognizes various kinds of executable files other than Hunk format created for Motorola 68000.

=== ELF ===
Phase5 implemented ELF executables for its PowerUP accelerator boards. It was found cumbersome due to its dynamic linking. This format was then adopted as standard by AmigaOS 4.0, MorphOS and AROS. ELF support was added to WarpUp by 3rd party developers and Hyperion Entertainment released number of WarpUp games in ELF format only.

=== Extended Hunk format ===
In 1997 Haage & Partner developer WarpUp PowerPC kernel for PowerUP accelerator boards. Instead of ELF binary format they had chosen to expand existing hunk format. The problem with ELF binary format was that users had to patch their system to load ELF executables and mixing PPC/68k code was not possible. Extended Hunk Format (EHF), developed by Haage & Partner, allowed mixing PPC and 68k code to single executable without modifying the existing system if PowerPC accelerator was not installed. ^{[1]}^{[2]}.

=== AmigaOS 4 and MorphOS ===
AmigaOS 4.0 and MorphOS can run ELF natively, but as these systems were designed to run on PowerPC processor-based machines, the developers added also compatibility for WarpUP software, used in AmigaOS 3.9. In addition MorphOS implements PowerUp software compatibility as implemented by Phase5 for PowerUP accelerator cards.

Both new operating systems can also run Amiga Hunk format because they implement the old Amiga API environment based on AmigaOS 3.1, and can run 68000 code through emulation.

- Notes:
1. See also pages regarding history of the PPC processor on Amiga at Amiga.History site.
2. EHF specifications (also in English) on Haage&Partners site.

== See also ==
- Comparison of executable file formats
- vasm, a free assembler part of vbcc
