= ECOFF =

File format

- Filename extension: none, .o, .so
- Developed by: MIPS
- Type of format: Binary, executable, object, shared libraries
- Extended from: COFF

The Extended Common Object File Format (ECOFF) is a file format for executables, object code, and shared libraries, extended from the COFF specification.

ECOFF was developed for the MIPS platform, and was used by DEC Ultrix and Tru64 (previously Digital Unix and OSF/1), SGI Irix, Linux/MIPS and the Net Yaroze.

== See also ==
- Comparison of executable file formats
