= Xslimmer =

- Xslimmer running on Mac OS X 10.5
- Developer(s): LateNiteSoft
- Final release: 1.9.4 / October 17, 2013 (Discontinued)
- Operating system: Mac OS X
- Type: Utility software
- License: Shareware
- Website: xslimmer.com

Xslimmer is a discontinued application for Apple's Mac OS X developed by LateNiteSoft.

The software is a utility to tweak universal binaries by stripping the binary of either its PowerPC or Intel code (depending on the system architecture used). This recovers hard disk space. Purportedly, the recovered space is significant. For example, according to the developers Google Earth 4 shrinks from 101 MB to 52.8 MB (a 47% reduction).

The developer's stated goal of Xslimmer is to achieve size reduction without compromising functionality. As of version 1.2, the option to strip applications of unwanted language files and localizations is added.

Additional features for safe use that Apple's lipo and ditto command-line utilities don't have include a "blacklist" and a custom folder list (populated with key system locations by default). The blacklisted applications are those known not to work if stripped which generally only happens with copy-protected ones. This prevents applications (or the system itself) from becoming unable to work after the size reduction.

With the "App Finder Genie", a user can list all application candidates for size reduction and choose to slim them to recover hard disk space.

== Performance ==
The mini-review of The Apple Blog states that Photoshop CS3 (Beta) now has “a solid 5-second launch time vs. the previous 6–8 seconds” on a 2 GHz MacBook with 2 GB RAM. This was achieved after slimming the binary, restarting the computer, and reopening the application. Other applications may benefit from similar speed improvements. However, most of the Adobe Suite CS3 applications are now on the blacklist.
