= BenQ-Siemens EL71 =

2006 mobile phone model

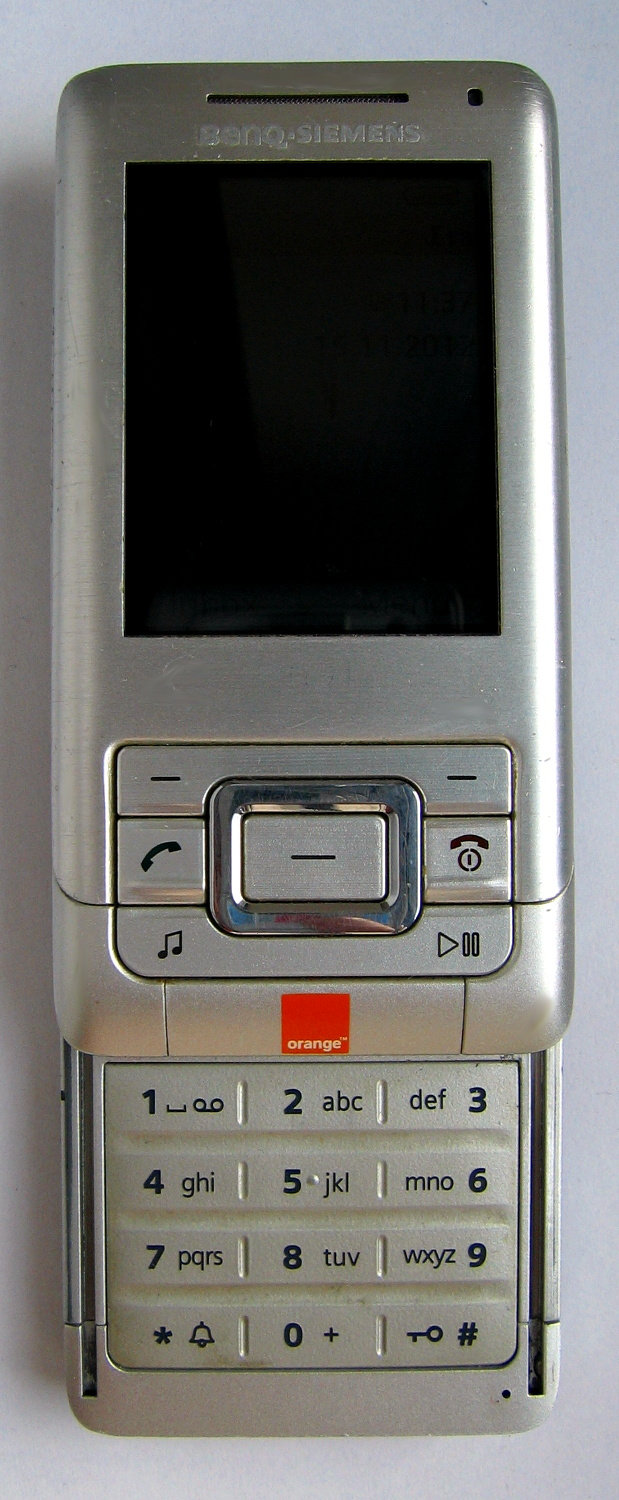
The BenQ-Siemens EL71

The BenQ-Siemens EL71 is a slider-type GSM triband mobile phone had been developed before by Siemens Mobile and released by BenQ Mobile. It has a sleek design with brushed magnesium and aluminium alloys. The phone was introduced at CEBIT in March 2006.

The phone supports GPRS, EDGE and Internet access methods. Its dimensions are 90 mm × 46 mm × 17 mm, and it weighs 94 grams. The supplied battery has a capacity of 570 mAh and can last up to 300 hours in standby mode, or 300 minutes if the phone is used for calls. Other notable features of the phone include a QVGA display, Bluetooth, a Java virtual machine and 1.3 megapixel camera with LED flash.
