= RISC-V ecosystem =

Software and hardware ecosystem for the RISC-V instruction set architecture

The RISC-V ecosystem includes systems that boot with UEFI, handle power management with ACPI and run a variety of operating systems including Linux distributions such as Ubuntu.

Notable software with limited or experimental support on RISC-V includes .NET (initial RISC-V runtime support has been in development since 2023 but remains unofficial as of 2026), VirtualBox, and VMware ESXi. Microsoft Windows has no RISC-V support.

Cloud providers with RISC-V servers include Scaleway and Cloud-V but not Microsoft Azure or Amazon Web Services (AWS).

== Hardware ==
Freedom U540 and HiFive Unleashed by SiFive.

ESP32 by Espressif Systems.

SpacemiT K3 by SpacemiT.

== Assemblers ==
- GNU Assembler
- TCCASM

== Bootloaders ==
- Barebox
- Das U-Boot
- GNU GRUB
- Limine

== Compilers ==
- GNU Compiler Collection (GCC)
- LLVM / Clang
- Tiny C Compiler (TCC)

== Debuggers ==
- GNU Debugger (gdb)
- LLDB

== Decompilers ==
- JEB decompiler

== Disassemblers ==
- Binary Ninja
- Ghidra
- Interactive Disassembler (IDA Pro)
- Radare2

== Emulators ==
- felix86 – x86-64 userspace emulator
- QEMU

== Hypervisors ==
- bhyve (FreeBSD)
- KVM (Linux)
- Intel Cloud Hypervisor
- Xen
- XtratuM

== Simulators ==
- gem5
- Spike

== Operating systems ==
- Android (unofficial experimental support)
- Linux
- FreeBSD (tier 2), NetBSD, OpenBSD
- Haiku
- Tizen
- OpenHarmony

=== Embedded/real-time ===
- Apache Mynewt
- eCos
- FreeRTOS
- Nucleus RTOS
- NuttX
- PX5 RTOS
- RIOT
- RTEMS
- RT-Thread
- ThreadX
- Tock
- VxWorks
- Zephyr

=== Linux distributions ===
- Alpine Linux
- Chimera Linux
- Debian (official)
- Fedora Linux (as a secondary architecture)
- Gentoo Linux
- NixOS (experimental)
- openSUSE
- Red Hat Enterprise Linux (developer preview)
- Rocky Linux
- Ubuntu

== Misc ==
- ACPI since version 6.6 (released in May 2025)
- UEFI
- Armbian – Software framework for building Linux images for single-board computers
- Binary File Descriptor library – GNU support for multiple executable file formats
- BLIS – Numerical software library
- Buildroot – Tool for building Linux
- GNU Binutils – GNU software development tools for executable code
- glibc – GNU implementation of the standard C library
- musl – Implementation of C standard library for Linux operating system
- Newlib – Implementation of the C standard library for embedded systems
- FFmpeg – Multimedia framework
- Valgrind – Programming tool for profiling, memory debugging and memory leak detection
- strace – Diagnostic, debugging and instructional userspace utility for Linux
- OpenBLAS – Open-source software
- OVPsim – Full-system simulator
- TianoCore EDK II – Reference software implementation for UEFI
- coreboot – Open-source computer firmware
- Ada – High-level programming language first released in 1980 using GNAT
- D – Multi-paradigm system programming language using GCC
- Dart – Programming language
- Fortran – General-purpose programming language using GNU Fortran
- CircuitPython – Programming language for embedded electronics
- MicroPython – Microcontroller software based on Python
- Snek
- Go – Programming language
- Julia – Dynamic programming language (tier 3)
- Rust – General-purpose programming language
- Java (HotSpot)
- Mono – Computer software project
- Nim – Programming language
- OCaml – Programming language
- Zig – General-purpose programming language (tier 2)

== See also ==
- List of free and open-source EDA software
