= OllyDbg =

Debug software

- Original author: Oleh Yuschuk
- Developer: Oleh Yuschuk
- Stable release: 2.01 / 27 September 2013; 13 years ago
- Written in: C
- Operating system: Microsoft Windows
- Size: 6.6 MiB
- Type: Debugger
- License: GPL (version 2.01) Freeware (version 2.0) Shareware (version 1.x)
- Website: https://www.ollydbg.de/

OllyDbg (named after its author, Oleh Yuschuk) is an x86 debugger that emphasizes binary code analysis, which is useful when source code is not available. It traces registers, recognizes procedures, API calls, switches, tables, constants and strings, as well as locates routines from object files and libraries. It has a user friendly interface, and its functionality can be extended by third-party plugins. Version 1.10 is the final 1.x release. Version 2.0 was released in June 2010, and OllyDbg has been rewritten from the ground up in this release. Although the current version of OllyDbg cannot disassemble binaries compiled for 64-bit processors, a 64-bit version of the debugger has been promised. As of April 2022 the development of the project has been frozen and an incomplete 64-bit version can be downloaded from the website.

== License ==
The software is free of cost, but the shareware license of version 1.x requires users to register with the author. In version 2.x, the registration requirement was dropped. The source code can be purchased from the author.

The disassembler part of OllyDbg is free software, released under the GNU General Public License.

== Reverse engineering ==
OllyDbg is often used for reverse engineering of programs. It is often used by crackers to crack software made by other developers. For cracking and reverse engineering, it is often the primary tool because of its ease of use and availability; any 32-bit executable can be used by the debugger and edited in bitcode/assembly in realtime. It is also useful for programmers to ensure that their program is running as intended, and for malware analysis purposes.

== Related software ==
- Interactive Disassembler (IDA Pro)
- Radare2
- Ghidra
- Cheat Engine
- Debuggers for reverse-engineering software
- x64dbg
