= JD Decompiler =

Java programming language decompiler

JD - Java Decompiler
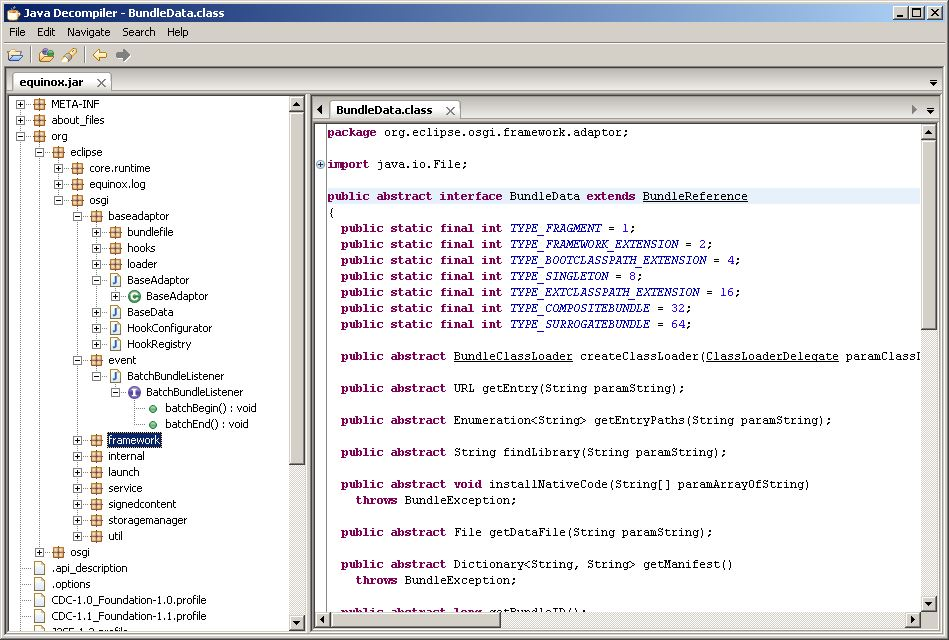
- Original author: Emmanuel Dupuy
- Stable release: JD-Core 1.1.3; JD-GUI 1.6.6; JD-Eclipse 2.0.0; JD-IntelliJ 0.6
- Written in: Java
- Platform: Cross-platform
- Available in: English
- Type: Software engineering
- License: GNU GPL 3
- Website: java-decompiler.github.io

JD (Java Decompiler) is a decompiler for the Java programming language. JD is provided as a GUI tool as well as in the form of plug-ins for the Eclipse (JD-Eclipse) and IntelliJ IDEA (JD-IntelliJ) integrated development environments.

JD supports most versions of Java from 1.1.8 through 10.0.2 as well as JRockit 90_150, Jikes 1.2.2, Eclipse Java Compiler and Apache Harmony and is thus often used where formerly the popular JAD was operated.

== Variants ==
In 2011, Alex Kosinsky initiated a variant of JD-Eclipse which supports the alignment of decompiled code by the line numbers of the originals, which are often included in the original Bytecode as debug information.

In 2012, a branch of JDEclipse-Realign by Martin "Mchr3k" Robertson extended the functionality by manual decompilation control and support for Eclipse 4.2 (Juno).

In 2022, Nicolas Baumann released an improved version of jd-gui named jd-gui-duo with a broad set of decompilers provided by Transformer API, which ships with an improved version of jd-core and also revives legacy engine jd-core-v0.

In 2026, Nicolas Baumann released an improved version of Eclipse Enhanced Decompiler named ECD++ with the same set of decompilers provided by Transformer API.

== See also ==
- JAD (software)
- Mocha
