= Ilfak Guilfanov =

Russian software developer

Ilfak Guilfanov (Russian: Ильфак Исмагилович Гильфанов, born 12 November 1966) is a Russian software developer, computer security researcher and blogger. He became well known when he issued a free hotfix for the Windows Metafile vulnerability on 31 December 2005. His unofficial patch was favorably reviewed and widely publicized because no official patch was initially available from Microsoft. Microsoft released an official patch on 5 January 2006.

Guilfanov was born in a small village in the Tatarstan Region of Russia in a Volga Tatar family.

He graduated from Moscow State University in 1987 with a Bachelor of Science in Mathematics.

He is the systems architect and main developer for IDA Pro, which is Hex-Rays' commercial version of the Interactive Disassembler Guilfanov created. A freeware version of this reverse engineering tool is also available.

Currently, he lives in Liège, Belgium.

He worked for DataRescue.

In 2005, Guilfanov founded Hex-Rays. In 2020, the income of the company has eclipsed the mark of 20 million euros per year.

In 2022, a consortium of investors Smartfin, SFPIM (Belgian sovereign wealth fund) and SRIW (development fund of Wallonia) acquired Hex-Rays for 81 million euros.
