= HiFive Unleashed =

Single board computer development board

- Also known as: HFV or HiFive
- Developer: SiFive
- Manufacturer: SiFive
- Type: SBC, dev board
- Generation: 1
- Released: February 1, 2018; 8 years ago
- Introductory price: $999 USD
- Operating system: Debian Linux
- System on a chip: Freedom U540
- Memory: 8 GB DDR4 with ECC
- Storage: MicroSD
- Website: www.sifive.com/boards/hifive-unleashed

The HiFive Unleashed, or HFU is a discontinued single-board computer development board created by SiFive with the intention to increase exposure and adoption of the open-source RISC-V architecture.

The HFU is capable of running the Debian Linux distribution and Quake II.
