= Mocha (decompiler) =

Java decompiler

- Original author: Hanpeter van Vliet
- Developer: Hanpeter van Vliet
- Release: June 1996; 30 years ago
- Final release: beta 1 / June 16, 1996; 30 years ago
- Written in: Java
- Operating system: Cross-platform
- Platform: Java virtual machine
- Type: decompiler
- License: freeware
- Website: www.brouhaha.com/~eric/software/mocha/

Mocha is a Java decompiler, which allows programmers to translate a program's bytecode into source code.

A beta version of Mocha was released in 1996, by Dutch developer Hanpeter van Vliet, alongside an obfuscator named Crema. A controversy erupted and he temporarily withdrew Mocha from public distribution. As of 2009 the program is still available for distribution, and may be used freely as long as it is not modified. Borland's JBuilder includes a decompiler based on Mocha. Van Vliet's websites went offline as he died of cancer on December 31, 1996, at the age of 34.

== See also ==
- JAD (JAva Decompiler)
- JD
