= Freedom U540 =

General information
- Launched: Early 2018
- Designed by: SiFive

Physical specifications
- Cores: 4

Architecture and classification
- Technology node: 28nm
- Instruction set: RISC-V

The Freedom U540 is a microprocessor using the RISC-V open architecture by fabless semiconductor company SiFive that is used to power the HiFive Unleashed computer. The U540 is one of the first commercially available microprocessors to use the RISC-V architecture, which is in contrast to the majority of the market, which uses mostly proprietary x86 and ARM microarchitectures. As the U540 was designed specifically for the HFU, it is not available on other devices or as a standalone component.

The U540 has a partial compatibility with coreboot.
