= JAD (software) =

- Developer(s): Pavel Kouznetsov
- Initial release: Before 1999; 26 years ago
- Stable release: 1.5.8g / 2006; 19 years ago
- Written in: C++
- Operating system: Cross-platform
- Available in: English
- Type: Software engineering
- License: Free for non-commercial use (Copyright: Pavel Kouznetsov)
- Website: Original Jad site, including downloads at the Wayback Machine (archived 14 February 2008)

Jad (Java Decompiler) is, as of August 2011, an unmaintained decompiler for the Java programming language. Jad provides a command-line user interface to extract source code from class files.

== See also ==
- Java Decompiler
- Mocha
