= Ghidra =

Free reverse engineering tool developed by the National Security Agency

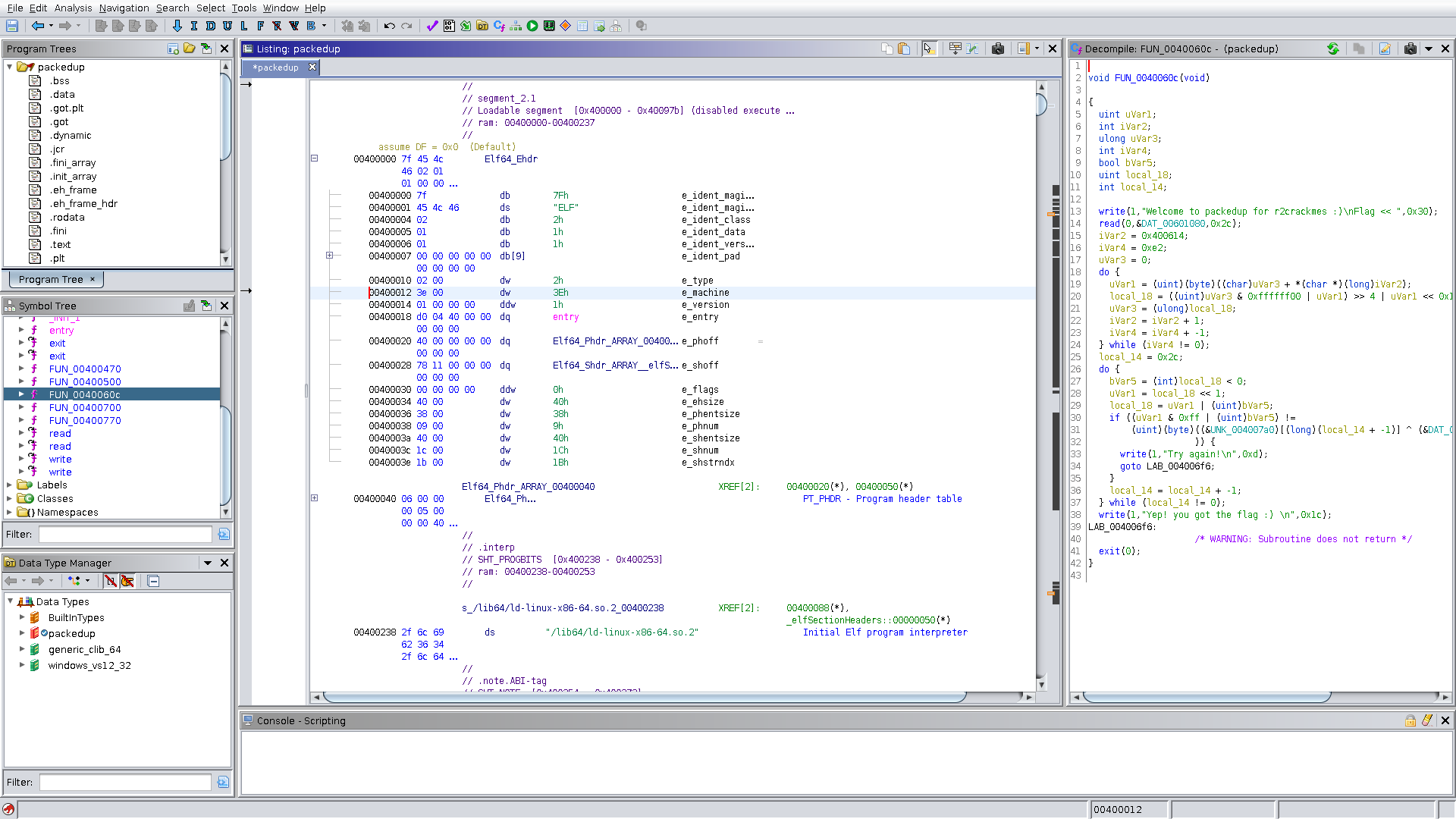
- Disassembly of a file in Ghidra
- Original author: National Security Agency
- Release: March 5, 2019; 7 years ago
- Stable release: 12.2 / October 22, 2026; 17 days ago
- Written in: Java, C++
- License: Apache License 2.0 / Public domain
- Website: ghidra-sre.org
- Repository: github.com/NationalSecurityAgency/ghidra

Ghidra (/ˈɡiːdrə/ GEE-druh) is a free and open source reverse engineering tool developed by the National Security Agency (NSA) of the United States. The binaries were released at the RSA Conference in March 2019; the source code was published one month later on GitHub.

The software is written in Java using the Swing framework for the GUI. The decompiler component is written in C++, and is therefore usable in a stand-alone form. Scripts to perform automated analysis with Ghidra can be written in Java or Python; current versions support Python through PyGhidra, while Jython is available as an optional extension. Plugins adding new features to Ghidra itself can be developed using a Java-based extension framework.

== History ==
Ghidra's existence was originally revealed to the public via Vault 7 in March 2017, but the software itself remained unavailable until its official declassification and release two years later. Some comments in its source code indicate that it existed as early as 1999.

High-level changelog
Version	Year	Major features
1.0	2003	Proof of concept
2.0	2004	Database, docking windows
3.0	2006	SLEIGH, decompiler, version control
4.0	2007	Scripting, version tracking
5.0	2010	File system browser
6.0	2014	First unclassified version
9.0	2019	First public release
9.2	2020	Graph visualization, new PDB parser
10.0	2021	Debugger
11.0	2023	Rust and Go binaries support, BSim
11.1	2024	Swift and DWARF 5 support, Mach-O improvement
12.0	2025	Importer filesystem mirroring

In June 2019, coreboot began to use Ghidra for its reverse engineering efforts on firmware-specific problems following the open source release of the Ghidra software suite.

Ghidra can be used as a debugger since Ghidra 10.0. Ghidra's debugger supports debugging user-mode Windows programs via WinDbg, Linux programs via GDB and macOS programs via LLDB.

== Supported architectures ==
Ghidra supports X86, AArch64, ARM, RISCV, PowerPC, 6502, and other architectures.

== See also ==
- IDA Pro
- JEB decompiler
- radare2
- Binary Ninja
