= DashO (software) =

Code obfuscator, compactor, optimizer, watermarker and encryptor

- Developers: Preemptive Solutions, LLC
- Initial release: January 1997; 28 years ago
- Stable release: 12.1.0 / 2 August 2023; 2 years ago
- Operating system: Windows, Linux, MacOS, Android.
- Type: Code obfuscator
- License: Proprietary software
- Website: www.preemptive.com/products/dasho

DashO is a code obfuscator, compactor, optimizer, watermarker, and encryptor for Java, Kotlin and Android applications. It aims to achieve little or no performance loss even as the code complexity increases.

DashO can also statically analyze the code to find unused types, methods, and fields, and delete them, thereby making the application smaller. DashO can delete used methods, that are not needed in published applications, such as debugging and logging calls.

== See also ==
- Dotfuscator — a code obfuscator for .NET.
- ProGuard (software) — a code obfuscator for Java.
