= ProGuard =

Open-source Java obfuscation tool

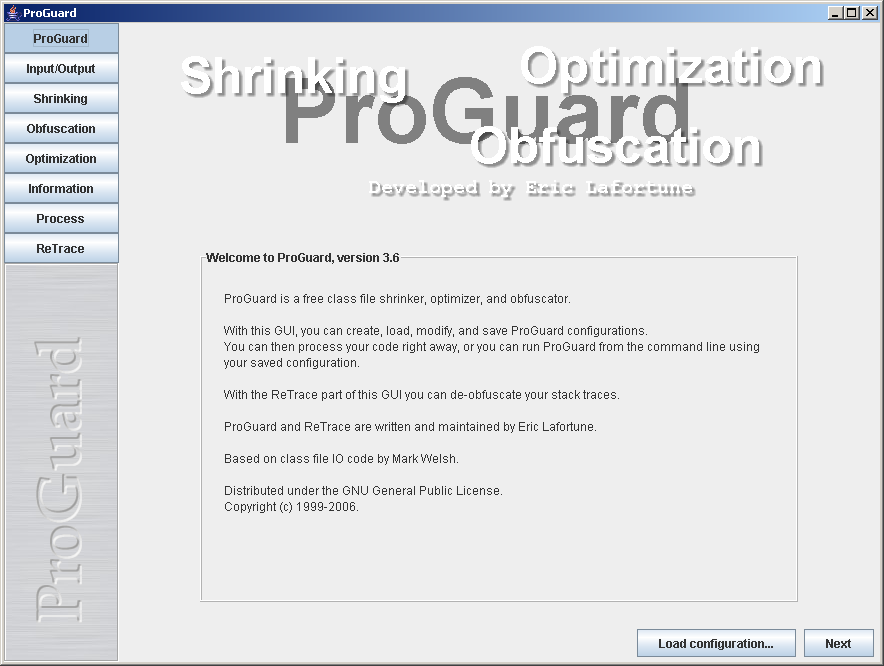
- ProGuard GUI
- Developer: Eric P.F. Lafortune
- Release: June 2002; 24 years ago
- Stable release: 7.9.1 / 9 April 2026; 2 months ago
- Written in: Java
- Operating system: Cross-platform
- License: GPLv2.0
- Website: www.guardsquare.com/en/products/proguard
- Repository: github.com/Guardsquare/proguard

ProGuard is an open source command-line tool which shrinks, optimizes and obfuscates Java code. It was created by Belgian software engineer Eric Lafortune and later formed the basis of Guardsquare, the mobile application security company he co-founded. It is able to optimize bytecode as well as detect and remove unused instructions. ProGuard is free software and is distributed under the GNU General Public License, version 2.

ProGuard was distributed as part of the Android SDK and ran when building the application in release mode.

== Features ==
- Bytecode-level optimizations;
- Also works with Java Micro Edition and Android;

=== Obfuscation Method ===
ProGuard obfuscates Java and Android programs by renaming classes, fields, and methods using meaningless names (an implementation of security through obscurity), making it more difficult to reverse-engineer the final application.

=== Optimization ===
Besides removing unused instructions from the compiled bytecode, ProGuard optimizes it using techniques such as control flow analysis, data-flow analysis, partial evaluation, static single assignment, global value numbering, and liveness analysis.

ProGuard can remove many types of unused and duplicated code, perform over 200 peephole optimizations, reduce variable allocation, inline constant and short methods, simplify tail recursion calls, remove logging code, amongst others.

== See also ==
- Java (programming language)
- Program optimization
- Obfuscation (software)
- Dotfuscator
- DashO (software)
