= Amit Sahai =

American cryptographer (born 1974)

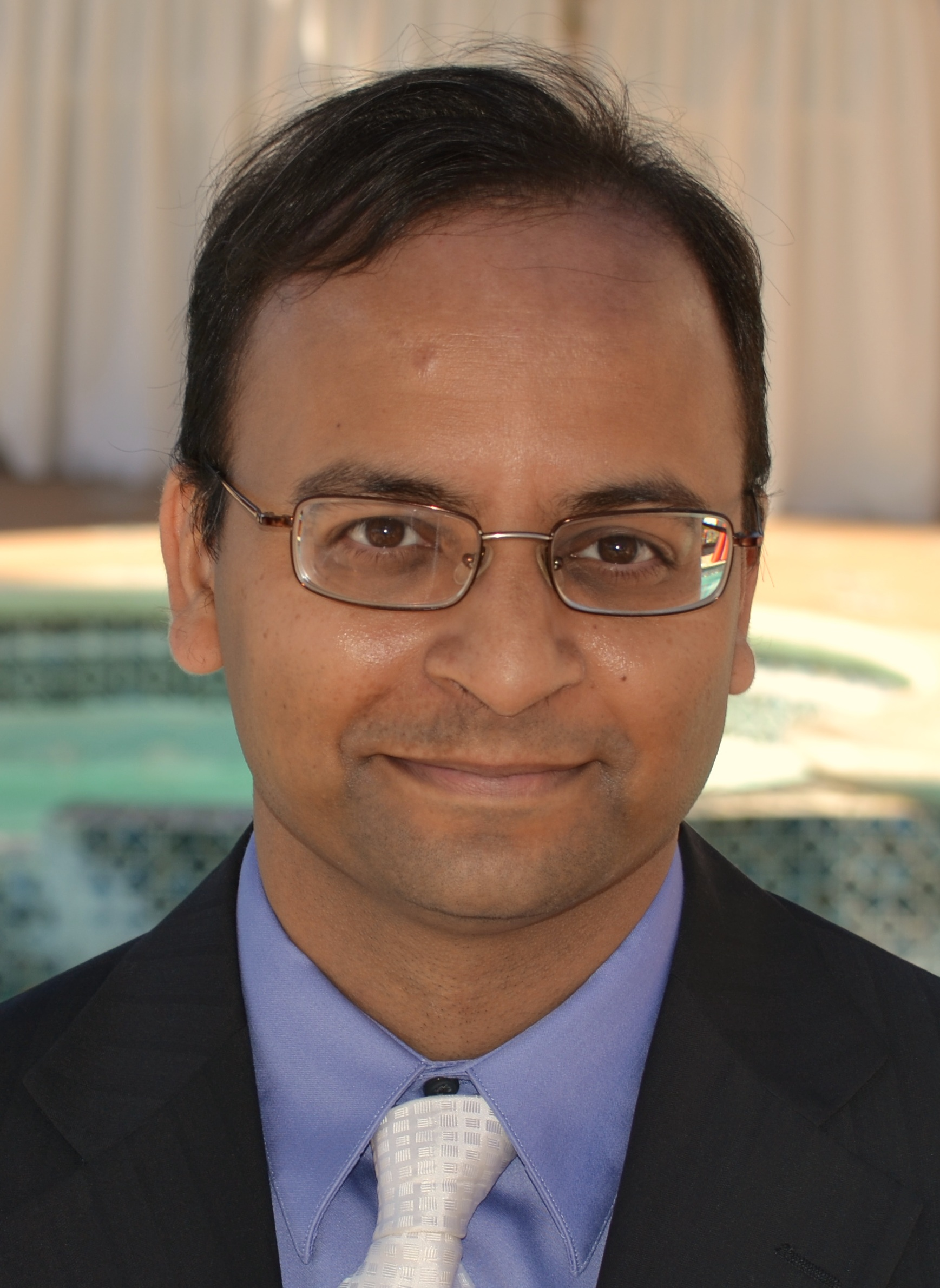
- Born: Amit Sahai; 1974 (age 51–52); Thousand Oaks, California, U.S.
- Education: UC Berkeley (BA); MIT (PhD)
- Known for: Indistinguishability obfuscation; Attribute-based encryption; Functional encryption; Concurrent zero-knowledge proofs; Secure multi-party computation
- Awards: Sloan Research Fellowship (2002); ACM Fellow (2018); IACR Fellow (2019); Simons Investigator (2021); AMS Fellow (2024); Held Prize (2022)
- Scientific career
- Fields: Computer science, cryptography
- Workplaces: Princeton University (2000–2004); UCLA (2004–present)
- Thesis: Frontiers in Zero Knowledge (2000)
- Doctoral advisor: Shafi Goldwasser
- Doctoral students: Edith Elkind; Brent Waters; Aayush Jain
- Website: www.cs.ucla.edu/~sahai/

Amit Sahai (born 1974) is an Indian-American computer scientist and cryptographer. He is a professor of computer science and (by courtesy) mathematics at the University of California, Los Angeles, where he holds the Symantec Endowed Chair in Computer Science and directs the Center for Encrypted Functionalities, a National Science Foundation Frontiers Center. He is a Fellow of the ACM, a Fellow of the International Association for Cryptologic Research, and a Simons Investigator.

Sahai is known for foundational contributions to cryptography, including the co-invention of indistinguishability obfuscation, attribute-based encryption, and functional encryption. In 2020, Sahai and collaborators resolved a central open problem in cryptography by constructing indistinguishability obfuscation from well-founded assumptions, a result described as achieving the "crown jewel" of the field. He received the 2022 Michael and Sheila Held Prize for this work and delivered an invited special sectional lecture at the International Congress of Mathematicians in 2022.

== Early life and education ==
Sahai was born in 1974 in Thousand Oaks, California, to parents who had immigrated from India. His brother is Anant Sahai, a professor of electrical engineering and computer sciences at the University of California, Berkeley.

He received a B.A. in mathematics with a minor in computer science from the University of California, Berkeley, summa cum laude, in 1996. At Berkeley, Sahai was named Computing Research Association Outstanding Undergraduate of the Year in North America and was a member of the three-person team that won first place at the 1996 ACM International Collegiate Programming Contest.

Sahai received his Ph.D. in computer science from MIT in 2000 under the supervision of Shafi Goldwasser. His dissertation, Frontiers in Zero Knowledge, addressed fundamental questions in the theory of zero-knowledge proofs.

== Career ==
From 2000 to 2004, Sahai was an assistant professor of computer science at Princeton University. In 2004, he joined the faculty at UCLA, where he holds the Symantec Endowed Chair in Computer Science and a courtesy appointment in the Department of Mathematics. He directs the Center for Encrypted Functionalities, an NSF Frontiers Center focused on the theory and applications of program obfuscation and secure computation.

Sahai serves as an editor of the Journal of Cryptology and has served on the program committees of major conferences including FOCS (program co-chair, 2023) and TCC (program chair, 2013). Since 2023, he has served as an advisor to the Prison Mathematics Project.

== Research ==
=== Indistinguishability obfuscation ===
A central thread in Sahai's research concerns indistinguishability obfuscation (iO), a cryptographic primitive that aims to make computer programs unintelligible while preserving their functionality. In 2001, Sahai co-authored a seminal paper with Boaz Barak, Oded Goldreich, Russell Impagliazzo, Steven Rudich, Salil Vadhan, and Ke Yang that formalized the notion of cryptographic obfuscation and demonstrated the impossibility of achieving the strongest form, known as virtual black-box obfuscation. That paper also proposed the weaker but still powerful notion of indistinguishability obfuscation.

In 2013, Sahai and collaborators constructed the first candidate general-purpose iO scheme, a development described as "a watershed moment for cryptography." However, the security of this scheme and its successors relied on newly introduced assumptions that were subsequently broken, leaving the status of iO uncertain.

In 2020, Sahai, together with Aayush Jain and Huijia Lin, resolved this long-standing open problem by constructing iO from the subexponential hardness of four well-studied cryptographic assumptions, including LWE and LPN. The result was widely covered in the scientific press, with Quanta Magazine describing iO as the "crown jewel" of cryptography. The paper received a Best Paper Award at STOC 2021.

=== Functional encryption and attribute-based encryption ===
Sahai co-authored the paper that introduced attribute-based encryption, originally termed "fuzzy identity-based encryption," with his doctoral student Brent Waters. This work, presented at Eurocrypt 2005, received the 2020 IACR Test of Time Award. Sahai and collaborators also helped formalize functional encryption, a generalization of public-key encryption in which secret keys can be associated with functions that determine what information a decryptor can learn from a ciphertext. The concept was described by the BBC World Service as promising "safer data" through more fine-grained access control.

=== Zero-knowledge proofs and secure computation ===
Sahai has made several contributions to the theory of zero-knowledge proofs. With Cynthia Dwork and Moni Naor, he introduced the concept of concurrent zero-knowledge proofs, addressing the security of zero-knowledge protocols when many instances run simultaneously. With Yuval Ishai, Eyal Kushilevitz, and Rafail Ostrovsky, he co-authored the paper that introduced the MPC-in-the-head technique, which uses secure multi-party computation protocols to construct efficient zero-knowledge proofs.

In secure multi-party computation, Sahai co-authored the first universally composable secure MPC protocol and the first such protocol that avoided the need for trusted setups, using a technique called "angel-aided simulation." He also co-developed the IPS compiler for building efficient MPC protocols from oblivious transfer.

=== Non-interactive proof systems ===
Sahai's 2008 paper with Jens Groth, "Efficient Non-interactive Proof Systems for Bilinear Groups," introduced a new type of non-interactive proof system offering improved efficiency for cryptographic applications over bilinear groups. The paper received the 2023 IACR Test of Time Award for Eurocrypt.

== Recognition ==
Sahai was named an Alfred P. Sloan Foundation Research Fellow in 2002. He received an Okawa Research Grant Award in 2007, a Xerox Foundation Faculty Award in 2010, and a Google Faculty Research Award in 2010. He received the Pazy Memorial Award in 2012.

He was elected an ACM Fellow in 2018 "for contributions to cryptography and to the development of indistinguishability obfuscation." In 2019, he was named a Fellow of the International Association for Cryptologic Research "for fundamental contributions, including to secure computation, zero knowledge, and functional encryption, and for service to the IACR." He was named a Simons Investigator by the Simons Foundation in 2021 and a Fellow of the Royal Society of Arts the same year.

In 2022, Sahai received the Michael and Sheila Held Prize from the National Academy of Sciences for "outstanding, innovative, creative, and influential research" in his development of indistinguishability obfuscation. That year, he was also invited to deliver a special sectional lecture at the International Congress of Mathematicians.

He was elected a Fellow of the American Mathematical Society in the 2024 class of fellows.

Sahai's papers have received multiple Test of Time Awards from the IACR (for Eurocrypt 2020, Eurocrypt 2023, and ACM CCS 2016), as well as a Best Paper Award at STOC 2021. For his teaching, he received the 2016 Lockheed Martin Excellence in Teaching Award from UCLA Samueli.

== Selected publications ==
- Prabhakaran, Manoj; Sahai, Amit, eds. (2013). Secure Multi-Party Computation. IOS Press. ISBN 978-1-61499-168-7.
