= Melissa Chase (disambiguation) =

Melissa Chase may refer to:

- Melissa Chase, American cryptographer
- Melissa Chase, animated character in television series Milo Murphy's Law
- Melissa Chase, morning drive time host on Richmond, Virginia radio station WURV
- Melissa Mae Chase, wife of actor and martial artist Mark Arnott
