= AARD code =

Segment of code in beta release of Windows 3.1

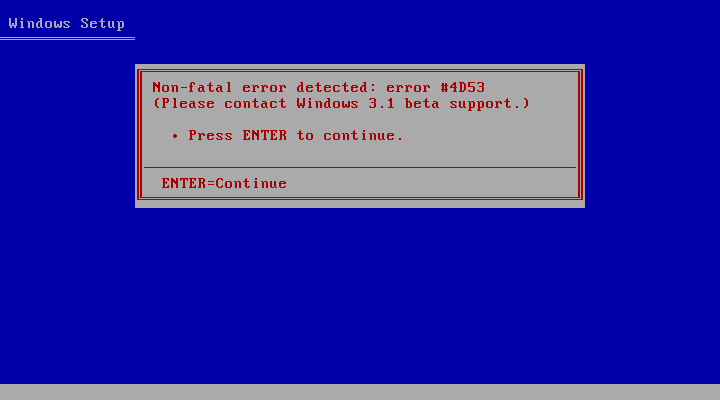
An example of the error message the AARD code would produce

The AARD code was a segment of code in a beta release of Microsoft Windows 3.1 that would issue a cryptic error message when run on the DR DOS operating system rather than the Microsoft-affiliated MS-DOS or PC DOS. Microsoft inserted the code in an attempt to manipulate people into not using competing operating systems; it is an example of the company's fear-uncertainty-doubt tactics.

== Description ==
This XOR-encrypted, self-modifying, and deliberately obfuscated x86 assembly code used a variety of undocumented MS-DOS structures and functions to detect if a machine was running DR DOS. The code was present in the installer, in the WIN.COM file used to load Windows, and in several other EXE and COM files within Windows 3.1.

The AARD code was discovered by Geoff Chappell on 17 April 1992 and further analyzed and documented in a joint research effort with Andrew Schulman. The name "AARD code" came from the letters "AARD" that were found in a hex dump of the Windows 3.1 installer; this turned out to be the signature of Microsoft programmer Aaron R. Reynolds (1955–2008).

Microsoft disabled the AARD code for the final release of Windows 3.1, but did not remove it, so it could be later reactivated by the change of a single byte.

DR DOS publisher Digital Research released a patch named "business update" in 1992 to bypass the AARD code.

== Memos ==
The rationale for the AARD code came to light when internal memos were released during the United States v. Microsoft Corp. antitrust case in 1999. Internal memos released by Microsoft revealed that the specific focus of these tests was DR DOS. At one point, Microsoft CEO Bill Gates sent a memo to a number of employees that said: "You never sent me a response on the question of what things an app would do that would make it run with MSDOS and not run with DR-DOS. Is there [sic] feature they have that might get in our way?" Microsoft Senior Vice President Brad Silverberg later sent another memo, saying: "What the [user] is supposed to do is feel uncomfortable, and when he has bugs, suspect that the problem is dr-dos and then go out to buy ms-dos."

After Novell bought DR DOS and renamed it "Novell DOS", Microsoft Co-President Jim Allchin wrote in a memo: "If you're going to kill someone there isn't much reason to get all worked up about it and angry. Any discussions beforehand are a waste of time. We need to smile at Novell while we pull the trigger."

== Lawsuit and settlement ==
Novell DOS changed hands again. The new owner, Caldera, Inc., began a lawsuit against Microsoft over the AARD code, Caldera v. Microsoft, which was later settled. It was originally believed that the settlement was around $150 million, (Note: approximately $280 million in 2025) but in November 2009, the settlement agreement was released, and the total was revealed to be $280 million. (Note: approximately $523 million in 2025)

== See also ==
- Bug compatibility
- Fear, uncertainty, and doubt (FUD)
- Halloween documents
