= Anti-tamper software =

Type of software

Anti-tamper software is software which makes it harder for an attacker to modify it. The measures involved can be passive such as obfuscation to make reverse engineering difficult or active tamper-detection techniques which aim to make a program malfunction or not operate at all if modified. It is essentially tamper resistance implemented in the software domain. It shares certain aspects but also differs from related technologies like copy protection and trusted hardware, though it is often used in combination with them. Anti-tampering technology typically makes the software somewhat larger and also has a performance impact. There are no provably secure software anti-tampering methods; thus, the field is an arms race between attackers and software anti-tampering technologies.

Tampering can be malicious, to gain control over some aspect of the software with an unauthorized modification that alters the computer program code and behaviour. Examples include installing rootkits and backdoors, disabling security monitoring, subverting authentication, malicious code injection for the purposes of data theft or to achieve higher user privileges, altering control flow and communication, license code bypassing for the purpose of software piracy, code interference to extract data or algorithms and counterfeiting. Software applications are vulnerable to the effects of tampering and code changes throughout their lifecycle from development and deployment to operation and maintenance.

Anti-tamper protection can be applied as either internally or externally to the application being protected. External anti-tampering is normally accomplished by monitoring the software to detect tampering. This type of defense is commonly expressed as malware scanners and anti-virus applications. Internal anti-tampering is used to turn an application into its own security system and is generally done with specific code within the software that will detect tampering as it happens. This type of tamper proofing defense may take the form of runtime integrity checks such as cyclic redundancy checksums, anti-debugging measures, encryption or obfuscation. Execution inside a virtual machine has become a common anti-tamper method used in recent years for commercial software; it is used for example in StarForce and SecuROM. Some anti-tamper software uses white-box cryptography, so cryptographic keys are not revealed even when cryptographic computations are being observed in complete detail in a debugger. A more recent research trend is tamper-tolerant software, which aims to correct the effects of tampering and allow the program to continue as if unmodified. A simple (and easily defeated) scheme of this kind was used in the Diablo II video game, which stored its critical player data in two copies at different memory locations and if one was modified externally, the game used the lower value.

Anti-tamper software is used in many types of software products including: embedded systems, financial applications, software for mobile devices, network-appliance systems, anti-cheating in games, military, license management software, and digital rights management (DRM) systems. Some general-purpose packages have been developed which can wrap existing code with minimal programing effort; for example the SecuROM and similar kits used in the gaming industry, though they have the downside that semi-generic attacking tools also exist to counter them. Malicious software itself can and has been observed using anti-tampering techniques, for example the Mariposa botnet.

== See also ==
- Denuvo
- Fault tolerance
- Hardening (computing)
- Security through obscurity
