= Plug compatibility =

Hardware designed to perform exactly like or with another vendor's product

Plug compatibility is a characteristic of computer hardware that performs exactly like that of another vendor. Manufacturers who made replacements for IBM peripherals were referred to as plug-compatible manufacturers (PCMs). Later plug-compatible mainframe (also PCM) referred to IBM-compatible mainframe computers. PCM can also mean plug-compatible machine or plug-compatible module.

== Plug compatibility and peripherals ==
Before the rise of the plug-compatible peripheral industry, computing systems were either configured with peripherals designed and built by the CPU vendor or designed to use vendor-selected rebadged devices.

The first examples of plug-compatible IBM subsystems were tape drives and controls offered by Telex beginning 1965. Memorex in 1968 was first to enter the IBM plug-compatible disk market, followed shortly thereafter by a number of suppliers such as CDC, Itel, and Storage Technology Corporation. This was boosted by the world's largest user of computing equipment, the US General Services Administration, buying plug-compatible equipment.

Eventually there were third-party plug-compatible alternatives to most first-party peripherals and first-party system main memory.

== Plug compatibility and computer systems ==
A plug-compatible machine is one that is backward compatible with a prior machine. In particular, a new computer system that is plug-compatible has not only the same connectors and protocol interfaces to peripherals, but also binary-code compatibility—it runs the same software as the old system. A plug compatible manufacturer, or PCM, is a company that makes such products.

One recurring theme in plug-compatible systems is the ability to be bug compatible as well. That is, if the forerunner system had software or interface problems, then the successor must have (or simulate) the same problems. Otherwise, the new system may generate unpredictable results, defeating the objective of full compatibility. Thus, it is important for customers to understand the difference between a bug and a feature, where the latter is defined as an intentional modification to the previous system (e.g. higher speed, lighter weight, smaller package, better operator controls, etc.).

=== Plug compatibility and IBM mainframes ===
The original example of plug-compatible mainframes was the Amdahl 470 mainframe computer which was plug-compatible with the IBM System 360 and 370, costing millions of dollars to develop. Similar systems were available from Comparex, Fujitsu, and Hitachi. Not all were large systems. Most of these system vendors eventually left the PCM market. In late 1981, there were eight PCM companies, and collectively they had 36 IBM-compatible models.

== Non-computer usage of plug compatibility ==
Plug compatibility may also be used to describe replacement criteria for other components available from multiple sources. For example, a plug-compatible cooling fan may need to have not only the same physical size and shape, but also similar capability, run from the same voltage, use similar power, attach with a standard electrical connector, and have similar mounting arrangements. Some non-conforming units may be re-packaged or modified to meet plug-compatible requirements, as where an adapter plate is provided for mounting, or a different tool and instructions are supplied for installation, and these modifications would be reflected in the bill of materials for such components. Similar issues arise for computer system interfaces when competitors wish to offer an easy upgrade path.

In general, plug-compatible systems are designed where industry or de facto standards have rigorously defined the environment, and there is a large installed population of machines that can benefit from third-party enhancements. Plug compatible does not mean identical. However, nothing prevents a company from developing follow-on products that are backward-compatible with its own early products.

== See also ==
- Bug compatibility
- Clone (computing)
- Computer compatibility
- Hercules (emulator)
- Pin compatibility
- Proprietary hardware
- Second source
- Vendor lock-in
- Honeywell 200, chasing the IBM 1401 market
- Xerox 530, chasing the IBM 1130 market
