= Brent Waters =

American computer scientist

- Education: Princeton University
- Awards: Grace Murray Hopper Award (2015)
- Scientific career
- Fields: Theoretical computer science
- Workplaces: University of Texas at Austin
- Thesis: Cryptographic algorithms for privacy in an age of ubiquitous recording (2004)
- Doctoral advisor: Edward Felten; Amit Sahai

Brent R. Waters is an American computer scientist, specializing in cryptography and computer security.

== Career ==
Waters attended the University of California, Los Angeles, where he graduated in 2000, with a BS in computer science. He earned a PhD in computer science from Princeton University in 2004.

Waters completed his post-doctoral work at Stanford University from 2004 to 2005, hosted by Dan Boneh, and then worked at SRI International as a computer scientist until 2008. In 2008, he joined the University of Texas at Austin, where he currently holds the title of Professor in the Department of Computer Science. In July 2019, he joined to work in their Cryptography and Information Security (CIS) Laboratory.

In 2005, Waters first proposed the concepts of attribute-based encryption and functional encryption with Amit Sahai.

Brent Waters currently works at NTT Research as the director of the NTT Research Cryptography and Information Security (CIS) Lab and Distinguished Scientist.

== Awards ==
Waters was awarded the Sloan Research Fellowship in 2010. In 2011, he was awarded the Presidential Early Career Award for Scientists and Engineers and a Packard Fellowship. In 2015, he was awarded the Grace Murray Hopper Award, for the introduction and development of the concepts of attribute-based encryption and functional encryption. In 2019, he was named a Simons Investigator in theoretical computer science. He was elected an ACM Fellow in 2021.

== Selected publications ==
- Goyal, Vipul; Pandey, Omkant; Sahai, Amit; Waters, Brent (2006). "Attribute-based encryption for fine-grained access control of encrypted data". Proceedings of the 13th ACM conference on Computer and communications security. pp. 89–98. doi:10.1145/1180405.1180418. ISBN 1595935185. S2CID 5131034.
- John Bethencourt; Amit Sahai; Brent Waters (May 2007), Ciphertext-Policy Attribute-Based Encryption, Institute of Electrical and Electronics Engineers, doi:10.1109/sp.2007.11, Wikidata Q107459178
- Sahai, Amit; Waters, Brent (2005). "Fuzzy Identity-Based Encryption". Advances in Cryptology – EUROCRYPT 2005. Lecture Notes in Computer Science. Vol. 3494. pp. 457–473. doi:10.1007/11426639_27. ISBN 978-3-540-25910-7.
- Waters, Brent (2005). "Efficient Identity-Based Encryption Without Random Oracles". Advances in Cryptology – EUROCRYPT 2005. Lecture Notes in Computer Science. Vol. 3494. pp. 114–127. doi:10.1007/11426639_7. ISBN 978-3-540-25910-7.
- Waters, Brent (2011). "Ciphertext-Policy Attribute-Based Encryption: An Expressive, Efficient, and Provably Secure Realization". Public Key Cryptography – PKC 2011. Lecture Notes in Computer Science. Vol. 6571. Public Key Cryptography – PKC 2011. pp. 53–70. doi:10.1007/978-3-642-19379-8_4. ISBN 978-3-642-19378-1.
