= Leap year problem =

Issue resulting in miscalculation of leap years

The leap year problem (also known as the leap year bug or the leap day bug) is a problem for both digital (computer-related) and analog documentation and data storage situations which results from errors in the calculation of which years are leap years, or from manipulating dates without regard to the difference between leap years and common years.

== Categories ==
Leap year bugs typically fall into two categories, based on the amount of impact they may have in real-world usage:

1. Those that lead to error conditions, such as exceptions, error return codes, uninitialized variables, or endless loops
2. Those that lead to incorrect data, such as off-by-one problems in range queries or aggregation

== Examples ==
=== Python ===
The following Python code is an example of a Category 1 leap year bug. It will work properly until today becomes February 29. Then, it will attempt to create a February 29 of a common year, which does not exist. The date constructor will raise a ValueError with the message "day is out of range for month".

from datetime import date
today = date.today()
later = today.replace(year = today.year + 1)

=== Windows C++ ===
The following Windows C++ code is an example of a Category 1 leap year bug. It will work properly until the current date becomes February 29 of a leap year. Then, it will modify st to represent February 29 of a common year, a date which does not actually exist. Passing st to any function that accepts a SYSTEMTIME struct as a parameter will likely fail.

For example, the SystemTimeToFileTime call shown here will return an error code. Since that return value is unchecked (which is extremely common), this will result in ft being left uninitialized.

SYSTEMTIME st;
FILETIME ft;

GetSystemTime(&st);
st.wYear++;

SystemTimeToFileTime(&st, &ft);

=== Microsoft C# ===
The following .NET C# code is an example of a Category 1 leap year bug. It will work properly until dt becomes February 29. Then, it will attempt to create a February 29 of a common year, which does not exist. The DateTime constructor will throw an ArgumentOutOfRangeException.

DateTime dt = DateTime.Now;
DateTime result = new DateTime(dt.Year + 1, dt.Month, dt.Day);

=== JavaScript ===
The following JavaScript code is an example of a Category 2 leap year bug. It will work properly until dt becomes February 29, such as on 2020-02-29. Then it will attempt to set the year to 2021. Since 2021-02-29 doesn't exist, the Date object will roll forward to the next valid date, which is 2021-03-01.

var dt = new Date();
dt.setFullYear(dt.getFullYear() + 1);

=== Bad leap year algorithm (many languages) ===
The following code is an example of a leap year bug that is seen in many languages. It may cause either a Category 1 or Category 2 impact, depending on what the result is used for. It incorrectly assumes that a leap year occurs exactly every four years.

bool isLeapYear = year % 4 == 0;

The correct leap year algorithm is explained here:.

== Occurrences ==
- Microsoft Excel has, since its earliest versions, incorrectly considered 1900 to be a leap year, and therefore that February 29 comes between February 28 and March 1 of that year. The bug originated from Lotus 1-2-3, and was purposely implemented in Excel for the purpose of backward compatibility. Microsoft has written an article about this bug, explaining the reasons for treating 1900 as a leap year. This bug has been promoted into a requirement in the Ecma Office Open XML (OOXML) specification.
- In 1996, on December 31, at two aluminum smelting plants at Tiwai Point, New Zealand, and Bell Bay, Tasmania, Australia, each of the 660 computers controlling the smelting potlines shut down at midnight since the computers were not programmed to handle the 366th day of the year (1996 being a leap year and having contained a February 29). Repair costs were estimated at more than NZ$1 million.
- In 2000, on December 31, in Norway the national railroad company Vy discovered all 29 of its new Signatur trains failed to run because their onboard computers did not recognize the date as the 366th day of the year. As an interim measure, engineers restarted the trains by resetting their clocks back by a month.
- At midnight on December 31, 2008, many first generation Zune 30 models froze. Microsoft stated that the problem was caused by the internal clock driver written by Freescale and the way the device handles a leap year. It automatically fixed itself 24 hours later, but an intermediate "fix" for those who did not wish to wait was to drain the device's battery and then recharge after noon UTC on January 1, 2009.
- Sony's PlayStation 3 incorrectly treated 2010 as a leap year, so the non-existent February 29, 2010, was shown on March 1, 2010, and caused a program error.
- In 2012, TomTom satellite navigation devices malfunctioned due to a leap year bug that first emerged on March 31.
- In 2012, Gmail's chat history showed a date of December 31, 1969, for all chats saved on February 29.
- In 2012, Microsoft Azure was taken offline by a leap year bug on February 28 that caused virtual machines to crash upon startup. At 5:45 p.m. PST the Windows Azure team became aware of an issue, which was eventually discovered to be caused by a "one year from now" operation that involved changing the year without changing the day.
- In 2016, a leap year bug in the luggage conveyor system at Düsseldorf Airport on February 29 caused over 1200 pieces of luggage to miss their flights.
- In 2024, a leap year bug with the self-payment machines caused pay-at-pump fuelling stations in New Zealand to go offline for more than 10 hours.

For more detailed lists of leap year bugs in the years 2016, 2020, and 2024, see the website Code of Matt.

== See also ==
- Time formatting and storage bugs
- Year 2100 problem
