= International Obfuscated C Code Contest =

Contest to produce obscure computer code

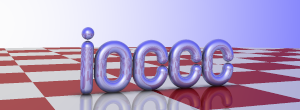
- The logo of the IOCCC
- Status: Active
- Genre: Coding contest
- Frequency: Semi-annually
- Years active: 1984–1996, 1998, 2000, 2001, 2004–2006, 2011–2015, 2018–2020, 2024-2025
- Inaugurated: 1984
- Founders: Landon Curt Noll, Larry Bassel
- Most recent: 2025
- Next event: Dec 2026
- Website: www.ioccc.org

The International Obfuscated C Code Contest (abbreviated IOCCC) is a computer programming contest for code written in C that is the most creatively obfuscated and held annually (when possible). It is described as "celebrating C's syntactical opaqueness". The winning code for the 28th contest, held in 2025/26, was announced by live stream 6 June 2026.

Entries are evaluated anonymously by the current sitting judges, Leonid A. Broukhis & Landon Curt Noll. The judging process is documented in the competition FAQ and consists of elimination rounds. By tradition, no information is given about the total number of entries for each competition. Winning entries are awarded with a category, such as "Worst Abuse of the C preprocessor" or "Most Erratic Behavior", and then announced on the official IOCCC website. The contest states that being announced on the IOCCC website is the reward for winning (plus bragging rights).

Previous contests were held in the years 1984–1996, 1998, 2000, 2001, 2004–2006, 2011–2015, 2018–2020, and 2024-2025.

== History ==
The IOCCC was started by Landon Curt Noll and Larry Bassel in 1984 while employed at National Semiconductor's Genix porting group. The idea for the contest came after they compared notes with each other about some poorly written code that they had to fix, notably the Bourne shell, which used macros to emulate ALGOL 68 syntax, and a buggy version of finger for BSD. The contest itself was the topic of a quiz question in the 1993 Computer Bowl. After a hiatus of five years starting in 2006, the contest returned in 2011.

Compared with other programming contests, the IOCCC is described as "not all that serious" by Michael Swaine, editor of Dr. Dobb's Journal.

In Don Libes' book says:

...they will undoubtedly force you to expand your own mind when you study them. And admittedly, some are just downright insane and only good for laughing at and making fun of.

== Rules ==
The Rules vary from year to year and are posted with a set of Guidelines that attempt to convey additional enlightenment about the Rules. They are published on the IOCCC website. In addition all material including winning entries are published under Creative Commons license BY-SA 4.0 International.

Hacking the contest rules is a tradition.

— Landon Curt Noll, 2011

The Rules are often deliberately written with loopholes that contestants are encouraged to find and abuse. Entries that take advantage of loopholes can cause the rules for the following year's contest to be adjusted.

The most significant of the Rules is Rule 2a & 2b (originally Rule 1), gross & net source size limits. During the life time of the contest, Rule 2 has evolved to accommodate subtle increases in source size limits. The 1984 contest started with a maximum source size of 512 bytes, which increased a few more times to 1536 bytes in 1991. In 1992, Rule 2 was split to distinguish between maximum overall size and maximum size ignoring white space and semicolons given certain conditions. In the early days, in order to make best use of space allowed, white space was stripped, often resulting in a compact blob of text, making it hard to read by humans, but served little purpose once passed through a C "pretty print" utility, which the judges did as part of their process. In 1992 the judges believed that form of obfuscation had played out and they wanted to encourage people to explore other ways of formatting the code, such as an ASCII image themed after the entry, or simply more traditionally indented C source. Around 2012/2013 the iocccsize(1) tool was adopted by the contest and tweaked to aid both contestants and judges apply the Rule 2b counting algorithm.

== Obfuscations employed ==
Entries often employ strange or unusual tricks, such as using the C preprocessor to do things it was not designed to do (Note: In some cases "spectacularly", according to Dr. Dobbs, with one entry creating an 11-bit ALU in the C preprocessor) or avoiding commonly used constructs in the C programming language in favor of much more obscure ways of achieving the same thing.

Contributions have included source code formatted to resemble images, text, etc., after the manner of ASCII art, preprocessor redefinitions to make code harder to read, and self-modifying code. In several years an entry was submitted that required a new definition of some of the rules for the next year, regarded as a high honor. An example is the world's shortest self-reproducing program. The entry was a program designed to output its own source code, and which had zero bytes of source code. When the program ran, it printed out zero bytes, equivalent to its source code.

In the effort to take obfuscation to its extremes, contestants have produced programs which skirt around the edges of C standards, or result in constructs which trigger rarely used code path combinations in compilers. As a result, several of the past entries may not compile directly in a modern compiler, and some may cause crashes.

During the hiatus between 2020 and 2024 (the Great Fork Merge), many of the winners were updated for modern compilers, for example converting from K&R C to at least C89 syntax, except where doing so would have broken the obfuscation (the original versions are still available for viewing). So with 2024, it should be possible to execute all the entries. The web site documents and invites C programmers to fix those winners still with outstanding issues.

== Examples ==
Within the code size limit of only a few kilobytes, contestants have managed to do complicated things – a 2004 winner turned out an operating system.

Modern compilers, benefiting from lessons learned from contest entries, warn users of problematic source code. You may need to suppress warnings to compile contest entries.

=== Toledo Nanochess ===
Toledo Nanochess is a chess engine created by Mexican software developer Oscar Toledo Gutiérrez, a five-time winner of the IOCCC. In accordance with IOCCC rules, the original being 1963 characters long. The author claims that it is the world's smallest chess program written in C.

The source code for Toledo Nanochess and other engines is available. Because Toledo Nanochess is based on Toledo's winning entry from IOCCC18, it is heavily obfuscated.

On February 2, 2014, the author published the book Toledo Nanochess: The commented source code, which contains the fully commented source code.

As of February 7, 2010, it appears to be one of only two chess engines written in less than 2 kilobytes of C that are able to play full legal chess moves, along with Micro-Max by Dutch physicist H. G. Muller. In 2014 the 1 kilobyte barrier was broken by Super Micro Chess – a derivative of Micro-Max – totaling 760 characters (spaces and newlines included). There is also a smaller version of Toledo's engine, the Toledo Picochess, consisting of 944 non-blank characters.

    typedef char ** C;
#define    F getchar())
 #define H(z)*n++=z;
       #include        <setjmp.h>
    #define v pain(0,0,0
           #define Z while(
                                                 #define _ if(
#define o(d) (u[l]=0,l[d]=6^e,q=1e4>v,0),l[d]=0,u[l]=e^6,q)
#define I(H,n) { _ r=l[x=H],!r|(r^e)<-1){ _ j=u[l],-7==r|6==r\
){ n; e=~e; return 1e5- f; } u[l]=0,t=j+1,i=j-1; _!i&89<x)i\
=j,t=6; _-1==t&30>x)t=j,i=-7; Z++i<t){ b=S; d=0; S&=63; \
a=((j^e)!=1?6!=(j^e)?O[32+x/10]-O[u/10+32]-q:(S|=6!=j?8\
:1,2==u-x)*9+9*(x-u==2):(d=1==j?x-u:u-x)/8+!(!((x-u)%\
10)|r)*99+(j==1?90<x:29>x)*(9*O[28+i]-288))+O[r+28\
]*9-288+O[x%10+33]-f-O[33+u%10]; x[l]=i; S|=(21=\
=u|21==x)*2+(u==28|28==x)*4+(91==u|x==91)*16+32\
*(u==98|x==98)+(20==d)*64*x; a-=k>f?pain(a,f+1\
,M,k):0; _ i==c&u==h&!f&N&a>-1e4&x==y)longjm\
p(z,1); S=b; _!N|f&&(a>M||!f&a==M&&1&rand()\
)){ _!f){ _ k){ c=i; h=u; y=x; } } else _ \
L-a<N){ n; e=~e; u[l]=j; x[l]=r; return\
 a; } M=a; } } x[l]=r; u[l]=j; n; } }
typedef int G; C kk; char J [ 78 ], O [ ]
=   "HRQAMS#-smaqrh[UTZYTU[|TBA("
"$#(ABT|ba`gg`ab8>GK[_`fFDZXEYR"         "L\t####"
"##B#A#@#G#F#E#D#K\t\3Zlv#tjm"         "\3J#tjm\3Pwb"
"ofnbwf\3Joofdbo\3)&`&`.&`&`"         "#+&g*\t"; G y,
c,h,e,S,*s,l[149]; jmp_buf z; G main(G L, C fa, C Na){
return pain(L, fa, Na, kk);}          G pain(G L,C fa,
C Na, C ka){G f=fa;		      G N=Na; G k=ka;
G u=99,p,q,r,j,i,x                  ,t, a, b,d,M=-1e9
; char *n; if( *l){ e=~e; Z       u >21){ q= l[--u]^e;
_!-- q){ _!l[p=e?u-10:u+10]){   I(p,)_ e?u>80   & !l[p
-=10]:u<39&!l[p+=10])I(p,)} _ l[p=e?u-11:9+u]   )I(p,)
else _ u-1==S>>6){ l[u-1]=0; I(p,l[u-1]=-2^e);  } _ l[
p=e?u-9:11+u])I(p,)else _ S>>6==1+u){ l[1+u]=0; I(p,l
[1+u]=e^-2); } } _!--q){ n=O+41; Z++n<50+O)I(u+80-*n,
)} _ 0<q&4>q){  n=q==2?53+O:O+49; Z++n<O+(q!=1)*4+54
){ p=u; do I(p-=*n-80,)Z!p[l]); } } _ 4==q){ n=49+O
 ; Z++n<O+58)I(u-*n+80,)_ e&!(S&24)|!e&!(S&3)&&k&&
 !l[u-2]&!l[u-1]&!l[u-3]&&o(u)&o(u-1)){ l[u-1]= 4
  ^e; l[u-4]=0; I(u-2,l[u-1]=0; l[u-4]=e^4); } _
  e&!(S&40)|!e&!(S&5)&&k&&!l[u+1]&!l[2+u]&&o(u)&
   o(1+u)){ l[u+1]=e^4; l[3+u]=0;   I(u+2,l[1+u
   ]=0; l[u+3]=4^e); } } } e=~e;   return M; }
    Z h<130){l[h]=-(21>h|98<h|2       >(h+1 )%
    10); O[h++]^=3; } n=O +14;       s=20+l; Z
     ++s<29+l){ 10[s]=1; 70[s]=~    ( * s = *
      n++ -+84); 60 [ s] =-2; } Z  n=J){ puts
       (58+O); u=19; Z++u<100){ H(32)_!( u%10
       ))H(32)H(O[7+l[u]])_(9+u)%10>7){ H(58
        -u/10)H(32)_ u&1)puts(n=J); } } puts
         (O+58); _-1e4 >v , 1)){ e=~e; puts
          (O+(v,0)> 1e4?e?90:82:96)); break
           ; } _ 1<L&e) { d=v,2+L); printf
            (O+114,h%10+64,58-h/10,y%10+64
             ,58 -y/10,d); } else{ putchar
              (62 ) ; h= (95 & F-44; c=l[h
                +=(56-F *10]; y=(95&F-44; y
                   +=(56-F*10; Z 10!=(u=(95
                    &F)){ c=5; Z--c>1&&u!=c
                      [O]); c=e^c-7; } } _!
                         setjmp(z)){ v+1,1);
                               puts(   106+
                                O); }   } Z
                                 10!=
                                  F; }

=== Pi ===
Below is a 1988 entry which calculates Pi by looking at its own area. This was written in the original K&R C.

Note: The original preprocessor line submitted in 1988 was #define _ -F<00||--F-OO--;, which exploited a bug in the K&R preprocessor, corrected before ANSI C89.

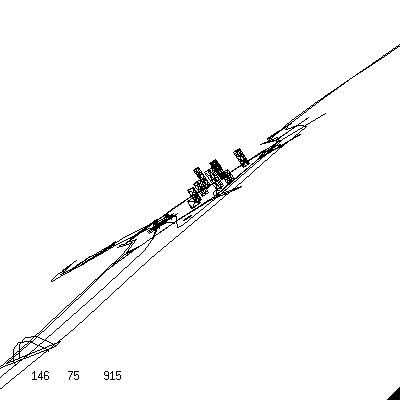
Pittsburgh scenery of the Flight simulator

#define _ F-->00||F-OO--;
int F=00,OO=00;main(){F_OO();printf("%1.3f\n",4.*-F/OO/OO);}F_OO()
{
            _-_-_-_
       _-_-_-_-_-_-_-_-_
    _-_-_-_-_-_-_-_-_-_-_-_
  _-_-_-_-_-_-_-_-_-_-_-_-_-_
 _-_-_-_-_-_-_-_-_-_-_-_-_-_-_
 _-_-_-_-_-_-_-_-_-_-_-_-_-_-_
_-_-_-_-_-_-_-_-_-_-_-_-_-_-_-_
_-_-_-_-_-_-_-_-_-_-_-_-_-_-_-_
_-_-_-_-_-_-_-_-_-_-_-_-_-_-_-_
_-_-_-_-_-_-_-_-_-_-_-_-_-_-_-_
 _-_-_-_-_-_-_-_-_-_-_-_-_-_-_
 _-_-_-_-_-_-_-_-_-_-_-_-_-_-_
  _-_-_-_-_-_-_-_-_-_-_-_-_-_
    _-_-_-_-_-_-_-_-_-_-_-_
        _-_-_-_-_-_-_-_
            _-_-_-_
}

=== Flight simulator ===
Another example is a flight simulator using X Windows, the winner of the 1998 IOCCC, as listed and described in Calculated Bets: Computers, Gambling, and Mathematical Modeling to Win (2001) and shown below:

#include                                     <math.h>
#include                                   <sys/time.h>
#include                                   <X11/Xlib.h>
#include                                  <X11/keysym.h>
                                          double L ,o ,P
                                         ,_=dt,T,Z,D=1,d,
                                         s[999],E,h= 8,I,
                                         J,K,w[999],M,m,O
                                        ,n[999],j=33e-3,i=
                                        1E3,r,t, u,v ,W,S=
                                        74.5,l=221,X=7.26,
                                        a,B,A=32.2,c, F,H;
                                        int N,q, C, y,p,U;
                                       Window z; char f[52]
                                    ; GC k; main(){ Display*e=
 XOpenDisplay( 0); z=RootWindow(e,0); for (XSetForeground(e,k=XCreateGC (e,z,0,0),BlackPixel(e,0))
; scanf("%lf%lf%lf",y +n,w+y, y+s)+1; y ++); XSelectInput(e,z= XCreateSimpleWindow(e,z,0,0,400,400,
0,0,WhitePixel(e,0) ),KeyPressMask); for(XMapWindow(e,z); ; T=sin(O)){ struct timeval G={ 0,dt*1e6}
; K= cos(j); N=1e4; M+= H*_; Z=D*K; F+=_*P; r=E*K; W=cos( O); m=K*W; H=K*T; O+=D*_*F/ K+d/K*E*_; B=
sin(j); a=B*T*D-E*W; XClearWindow(e,z); t=T*E+ D*B*W; j+=d*_*D-_*F*E; P=W*E*B-T*D; for (o+=(I=D*W+E
*T*B,E*d/K *B+v+B/K*F*D)*_; p<y; ){ T=p[s]+i; E=c-p[w]; D=n[p]-L; K=D*m-B*T-H*E; if(p [n]+w[ p]+p[s
]== 0|K <fabs(W=T*r-I*E +D*P) |fabs(D=t *D+Z *T-a *E)> K)N=1e4; else{ q=W/K *4E2+2e2; C= 2E2+4e2/ K
 *D; N-1E4&& XDrawLine(e ,z,k,N ,U,q,C); N=q; U=C; } ++p; } L+=_* (X*t +P*M+m*l); T=X*X+ l*l+M *M;
  XDrawString(e,z,k ,20,380,f,17); D=v/l*15; i+=(B *l-M*r -X*Z)*_; for(; XPending(e); u *=CS!=N){
                                   XEvent z; XNextEvent(e ,&z);
                                       ++*((N=XLookupKeysym
                                         (&z.xkey,0))-IT?
                                         N-LT? UP-N?& E:&
                                         J:& u: &h); --*(
                                         DN -N? N-DT ?N==
                                         RT?&u: & W:&h:&J
                                          ); } m=15*F/l;
                                          c+=(I=M/ l,l*H
                                          +I*M+a*X)*_; H
                                          =A*r+v*X-F*l+(
                                          E=.1+X*4.9/l,t
                                          =T*m/32-I*T/24
                                           )/S; K=F*M+(
                                           h* 1e4/l-(T+
                                           E*5*T*E)/3e2
                                           )/S-X*d-B*A;
                                           a=2.63 /l*d;
                                           X+=( d*l-T/S
                                            *(.19*E +a
                                            *.64+J/1e3
                                            )-M* v +A*
                                            Z)*_; l +=
                                            K *_; W=d;
                                            sprintf(f,
                                            "%5d  %3d"
                                            "%7d",p =l
                                           /1.7,(C=9E3+
                              O*57.3)%0550,(int)i); d+=T*(.45-14/l*
                             X-a*130-J* .14)*_/125e2+F*_*v; P=(T*(47
                             *I-m* 52+E*94 *D-t*.38+u*.21*E) /1e2+W*
                             179*v)/2312; select(p=0,0,0,0,&G); v-=(
                              W*F-T*(.63*m-I*.086+m*E*19-D*25-.11*u
                               )/107e2)*_; D=cos(o); E=sin(o); } }

=== Akari ===
Below is a 2011 entry which downsamples PGM, PPM images and ASCII art (of Akari from YuruYuri) by Don Yang:

                                       /*
                                      +
                                     +
                                    +
                                    +
                                    [         >i>n[t
                                     */   #include<stdio.h>
                        /*2w0,1m2,]_<n+a m+o>r>i>=>(['0n1'0)1;
                     */int/**/main(int/**/n,char**m){FILE*p,*q;int        A,k,a,r,i/*
                   #uinndcelfu_dset<rsitcdti_oa.nhs>i/_*/;char*d="P%"   "d\n%d\40%d"/**/
                 "\n%d\n\00wb+",b[1024],y[]="yuriyurarararayuruyuri*daijiken**akkari~n**"
          "/y*u*k/riin<ty(uyr)g,aur,arr[a1r2a82*y2*/u*r{uyu}riOcyurhiyua**rrar+*arayra*="
       "yuruyurwiyuriyurara'rariayuruyuriyuriyu>rarararayuruy9uriyu3riyurar_aBrMaPrOaWy^?"
      "*]/f]`;hvroai<dp/f*i*s/<ii(f)a{tpguat<cahfaurh(+uf)a;f}vivn+tf/g*`*w/jmaa+i`ni("/**
     */"i+k[>+b+i>++b++>l[rb";int/**/u;for(i=0;i<101;i++)y[i*2]^="~hktrvg~dmG*eoa+%squ#l2"
     ":(wn\"1l))v?wM353{/Y;lgcGp`vedllwudvOK`cct~[|ju {stkjalor(stwvne\"gt\"yogYURUYURI"[
     i]^y[i*2+1]^4;/*!*/p=(n>1&&(m[1][0]-'-'||m[1][1]  !='\0'))?fopen(m[1],y+298):stdin;
      /*y/riynrt~(^w^)],]c+h+a+r+*+*[n>)+{>f+o<r<(-m]    =<2<5<64;}-]-(m+;yry[rm*])/[*
       */q=(n<3||!(m[2][0]-'-'||m[2][1]))?stdout /*]{     }[*/:fopen(m[2],d+14);if(!p||/*
       "]<<*-]>y++>u>>+r >+u+++y>--u---r>++i+++"  <)<      ;[>-m-.>a-.-i.++n.>[(w)*/!q/**/)
    return+printf("Can "  "not\x20open\40%s\40"    ""       "for\40%sing\n",m[!p?1:2],!p?/*
  o=82]5<<+(+3+1+&.(+  m  +-+1.)<)<|<|.6>4>-+(>    m-        &-1.9-2-)-|-|.28>-w-?-m.:>([28+
 */"read":"writ");for  (   a=k=u= 0;y[u];  u=2    +u){y[k++   ]=y[u];}if((a=fread(b,1,1024/*
,mY/R*Y"R*/,p/*U*/)/*          R*/ )>/*U{  */   2&& b/*Y*/[0]/*U*/=='P' &&4==/*"y*r/y)r\}
*/sscanf(b,d,&k,& A,&           i,  &r)&&        !   (k-6&&k -5)&&r==255){u=A;if(n>3){/*
]&<1<6<?<m.-+1>3> +:+ .1>3+++     .   -m-)      -;.u+=++.1<0< <; f<o<r<(.;<([m(=)/8*/
u++;i++;}fprintf   (q,    d,k,           u      >>1,i>>1,r);u  = k-5?8:4;k=3;}else
  /*]>*/{(u)=/*{   p> >u  >t>-]s                >++(.yryr*/+(    n+14>17)?8/4:8*5/
     4;}for(r=i=0  ;  ;){u*=6;u+=                (n>3?1:0);if    (y[u]&01)fputc(/*
      <g-e<t.c>h.a r  -(-).)8+<1.                 >;+i.(<)<     <)+{+i.f>([180*/1*
      (r),q);if(y[u   ]&16)k=A;if                               (y[u]&2)k--;if(i/*
      ("^w^NAMORI; {   I*/==a/*"                               )*/){/**/i=a=(u)*11
       &255;if(1&&0>=     (a=                                 fread(b,1,1024,p))&&
        ")]i>(w)-;} {                                         /i-f-(-m--M1-0.)<{"
         [ 8]==59/* */                                       )break;i=0;}r=b[i++]
            ;u+=(/**>>                                     *..</<<<)<[[;]**/+8&*
            (y+u))?(10-              r?4:2):(y[u]         &4)?(k?2:4):2;u=y[u/*
             49;7i\(w)/;}             y}ru\=*ri[        ,mc]o;n}trientuu ren (
             */]-(int)'`';}             fclose(          p);k= +fclose( q);
              /*] <*.na/m*o{ri{                       d;^w^;}  }^_^}}
               "   */   return  k-                -1+   /*\'   '-`*/
                     (   -/*}/   */0x01        );       {;{    }}
                            ;           /*^w^*/        ;}

If the program is run using its own source as the input, the result is:

$ ./akari akari.c 
                   
                  
                       int
            *w,m,_namori=('n');
         #include<stdio.h>/*;hrd"%  dnd4%"*/
     /**/int(y),u,r[128*2/*{y}icuhya*rr*rya=
   */];void/**/i(){putchar(u);}int/**/main(/*
  "(n"l)?M5{YlcpvdluvKct[j skao(tve"t"oYRYR"
   */int(w),char**n){for(m  =256;--m;r[m]/*
   "<*]y+u>r>u+y-u-r+i+" )   ;>m.a.i+n>()/q*/
 =25<(31&( m -1))||64-(  m    &192)||2>w?m:(2+
m/*"*,/U//     R/)/U *  & /Y/0/U/=P &=/"*/)\
&16?m-13 : 13+     m)   ;u=+10 ;for(;(m=/*
 *>/()/{ p u t-s        +(yy*+  n1>7?/:*/
   getchar ())+1         ;i()   ){if(10/*
   "wNMR;{ I/=/"               )/{*/==u*1
    )i();                      if(m-10){
      u=/*>                  *./<)[;*/8*
      4;i();       }u=r[    m];}return(
       * *n/*{i            ;w; }_}
          ( -*/ *00    )    ;  }
$ ./akari akari.c > ./akari.small
$ ./akari ./akari.small 
         
      wm_aoi(n)
  /*ity,,[2*/{}char*y=
 (")M{lpduKtjsa(v""YY"
 "*yuruyuri") ;main(/*
/",U/  R)U*  Y0U= ="/\
*/){puts    (y+ 17/*
 "NR{I="       ){/=*
   =*         */);/*
   **/{      ;;}}
$ 
$ ./akari ./akari.small > ./akari.smaller
$ ./akari ./akari.smaller
   main
(){puts("Y"
"U RU YU "\
"RI"   )/*
 */   ;}
$

== See also ==
- Obfuscated Perl Contest
- Underhanded C Contest
- Esoteric programming language
- Code golf
