= Empress (software cracker) =

Video game cracker

EMPRESS
- Other name: C000005
- Years active: 2014–2023
- Known for: Software cracking Video game piracy

Empress (sometimes stylized EMPRESS) is a video game cracker who specializes in breaking anti-piracy software. While the true identity of Empress is unknown, she refers to herself as a young Russian woman. Empress has also released cracked games under the moniker C000005.

Empress is known as one of the few crackers who can crack Denuvo. Her motivation is to remove the software license aspect of digital games in an effort to preserve them after developers drop support. Empress also states that removing digital rights management (DRM) increases performance in-game. In late 2025, Empress announced that she would retire from cracking Denuvo-protected games, and a long statement titled End of an Era – EMPRESS circulated among her followers describing health issues and disillusionment with the piracy scene as reasons for her decision.

== Career ==
Empress became interested in the DRM-cracking scene in 2014. Her followers could participate in polls to select which game they want cracked next, and her work was funded through crowdsourced donations. Empress rose to prominence after releasing a cracked version of Red Dead Redemption 2. Other high-profile games cracked by Empress include Mortal Kombat 11 and Anno 1800. In February 2021, Empress stated that she would soon be arrested after being allegedly caught working on a crack for Immortals Fenyx Rising. Empress blamed FitGirl Repacks, with whom she had a feud. However, that March, Empress was available to publish a workaround for the online check-in system of Battle.net. Empress's arrest announcement was met with general skepticism by the cracking community.

She released a cracked version of Hogwarts Legacy in February 2023, just 12 days after release. Empress is known around the P2P scene for her "extremely opinionated" notes she supplies in the NFOs of her releases. For example, the information file supplied with the cracked version of Hogwarts Legacy expressed dissatisfaction with what was described as the "woke system" of today, defending Harry Potter series creator J.K. Rowling's views on transgender people.

In late 2025, she was reported to have stopped working on new cracks, with coverage noting a circulated statement titled "End of an Era – EMPRESS" that mentioned ongoing health problems and a loss of motivation towards the piracy scene as key reasons for stepping back.
