= Melissa Chase =

American cryptographer

Melissa Erin Chase is an American cryptographer known for her research on attribute-based encryption, digital credentials, and information privacy. She works at Microsoft Research.

== Education ==
Chase graduated in 2003 from Harvey Mudd College, with a senior thesis in mathematics about the shortest path problem, advised by Ran Libeskind-Hadas. She earned a Ph.D. from Brown University with Anna Lysyanskaya as her doctoral advisor.

== Contributions ==
At Microsoft, Chase is one of the developers of Picnic, a digital signature scheme that Microsoft has submitted to the National Institute of Standards and Technology Post-Quantum Cryptography Standardization competition. Chase spoke about the project as an invited speaker at Real World Crypto 2018 in Zürich.
