= Denuvo =

Anti-tamper software

Denuvo Software Solutions GmbH
- Industry: Digital rights management
- Founded: 23 September 2014
- Products: Denuvo Anti-Tamper
- Parent: Irdeto
- Website: irdeto.com/denuvo/

Denuvo Software Solutions GmbH is an Austrian company that develops anti-tamper and digital rights management (DRM) software. The company was formed from a management buyout of DigitalWorks, the developer of SecuROM, and began developing the software in 2014. It was introduced with FIFA 15 in September. Products including the anti-tamper software Denuvo Anti-Tamper, the anti-cheat system Denuvo Anti-Cheat and Nintendo Switch Emulator Protection, which attempts to prevent Nintendo Switch games from being emulated. The company was acquired by Irdeto in January 2018.

== History ==
Denuvo is developed by Denuvo Software Solutions GmbH, a software company based in Salzburg, Austria. The company was formed through a management buyout of DigitalWorks, the arm of the Sony Digital Audio Disc Corporation that developed the SecuROM DRM technology. In January 2018, the company and its 45 employees were acquired by the software company Irdeto. Development of the Denuvo software started in 2014. FIFA 15, released in September 2014, was the first game to use Denuvo.

3DM, a Chinese warez group, first claimed to have breached Denuvo's technology in a blog post published on 1 December 2014, wherein they announced that they would release cracked versions of Denuvo-protected games FIFA 15, Dragon Age: Inquisition and Lords of the Fallen. Following onto this, 3DM released the version of Dragon Age: Inquisition about two weeks after that game had shipped. The overall cracking progress took about a month, an unusually long time in the game cracking scene. When asked about this development, Denuvo Software Solutions acknowledged that "every protected game eventually gets cracked". However, technology website Ars Technica noted that most sales for major games happen within 30 days of release, and so publishers might consider Denuvo a success if it meant a game took significantly longer to be cracked. In January 2016, 3DM's founder, Bird Sister, revealed that they were to give up on trying to break the Denuvo implementation for Just Cause 3, and warned that, due to the ongoing trend for the implementation, there would be "no free games to play in the world" in the near future. Subsequently, 3DM opted to not crack any games for one year to examine whether such a move would have any influence on game sales. Denuvo's marketing director, Thomas Goebl, claimed that some console-exclusive games get PC releases due to this technology.

By October 2017, crackers were able to bypass Denuvo's protection within hours of a game's release, with notable examples being South Park: The Fractured but Whole, Middle-earth: Shadow of War, Total War: Warhammer II and FIFA 18, all being cracked on their release dates. In another notable case, Assassin's Creed Origins, which wrapped Denuvo within security tool VMProtect as well as Ubisoft's proprietary DRM used for their Uplay distribution software, had its security features bypassed by Italian collective CPY in February 2018, three months after the game's release. In December 2018, Hitman 2's protection was bypassed three days before its official release date, due to exclusive pre-order access, drawing comparisons to Final Fantasy XV, which had its protection removed four days before release.

By 2019, games like Devil May Cry 5, Metro Exodus, Resident Evil 2, Far Cry New Dawn, Football Manager 2019, and Soul Calibur 6 were cracked within their week of release. In the case of Rage 2, which was released on Steam as well as Bethesda Softworks' own Bethesda Launcher, the Steam version was protected by Denuvo, whereas the Bethesda Launcher version was not, leading to the game being cracked immediately, and Denuvo being removed from the Steam release two days later.

An anti-cheat sister product, Denuvo Anti-Cheat, was announced in March 2019. It was first used by Doom Eternal following an update in May 2020, although this change was reverted within a week after negative player feedback. In August 2022, Irdeto announced Nintendo Switch Emulator Protection, a DRM system for Nintendo Switch games that aims to prevent them from being emulated with programmes like Yuzu. Nintendo Switch owners widely criticised the announcement on social media, expressing concerns that it would decrease game performance. In response, Denuvo stated that the system would cause no performance impact on genuine hardware. The system was released in August 2023.

In 2026, a hacker going by the username "voices38" announced on Reddit that they were able to crack the Denuvo protection used in the 2025 video game Doom: The Dark Ages. Around a month later, voices38 cracked the 2026 game Resident Evil Requiem. In that same year, hackers devised a method of circumventing recent versions of Denuvo using a hypervisor-based bypass (CVE-2026-105051) where the crack operates at a level below the Windows kernel, intercepting certain processor instructions and feeding it back with false data to pass authentication checks. Due to the universal nature of the hypervisor bypass, it also allowed for rapid pirated releases of games that were otherwise protected by Denuvo. The method attracted controversy as it involves disabling key Windows security features and Irdeto stated in an interview with TorrentFreak that enhanced security measures are being worked on in response to the releases. On May 22, 2026, voices38 cracked the game Lego Batman: Legacy of the Dark Knight, being the first Denuvo game cracked on launch since Hitman 2, as well as Mafia: The Old Country almost a year after its release. Denuvo's protection in Assassin's Creed Black Flag Resynced was bypassed in July 2026. That same month, hackers operating under the pseudonyms DenuvOwO and LinUwUx released a method to run Denuvo-protected games on Linux, avoiding a full hypervisor on modern hardware while still requiring one on some older CPU architectures. Instead, the method operates largely in user space through a modified Proton compatibility build, reportedly making use of Linux CPU and process features, including cpuid_fault, along with Wine's syscall handling, to replicate work that the Windows-based bypass normally offloads to a hypervisor. On older CPU architectures, up to and including AMD Zen 3, this hypervisor component was reported to still be necessary. According to GameGPU, the method had been confirmed to work with 173 games across both Nvidia and AMD GPUs, and was also reported to support the Steam Deck.

== Technology ==
Games protected by Denuvo require an online activation. According to Empress, a notable Denuvo cracker, the software assigns a unique authentication token to each copy of a game, depending on factors like the user's hardware. The DRM is integrated with the game's code, which makes it especially hard to circumvent.

The Denuvo DRM system imposes a limit of 5 devices per license within a 24-hour period. Each of the five slots is autonomous and becomes available for a new device independently, exactly 24 hours after its specific use (utilizing an individual cooldown timer for each slot). Hardware changes (CPU, motherboard), critical OS/BIOS updates, or game updates can alter the device's hardware fingerprint, which the protection interprets as a new device, requiring the use of the next available slot.

== Criticism ==
Denuvo has been criticised for increasing CPU utilisation resulting in protected software having degraded performance relative to native code. Denuvo Software Solutions has denied this claim. In the case of Tekken 7 and Sonic Mania Plus, Denuvo caused a significant decrease in performance in several parts of the games. Sam Machkovech of Ars Technica reviewed in-depth how Denuvo was causing performance penalties, releasing an article on the matter in December 2018. In December 2018, Joel Hruska of ExtremeTech compared the performance of multiple games that use Denuvo and found that the games had significantly higher frame rates and lower loading times when the DRM system was disabled. Richard Leadbetter of Digital Foundry found that a pirated version of Resident Evil Village that removed Capcom's in-house DRM, which was protected by Denuvo, performed significantly better than the retail version. Capcom later released a patch for Village that, among other changes, altered how the game used Denuvo. Leadbetter noted that the patch improved performance, running equivalent to the pirated version.

In November 2021, several recent games using Denuvo were rendered unplayable, reportedly due to a Denuvo-owned domain name expiring. In the same month, it was reported that Denuvo Anti-Tamper was incompatible with Windows 10 and Windows 11 systems running on CPUs in the Alder Lake series. This was fixed by January 2022.

On October 18, 2024, Denuvo launched its official Discord server as part of a PR campaign, which they claim is an important step toward building stronger connections with game developers, publishers, and players. Later, Denuvo's Product manager Andreas Ullmann claimed, "moderating a group of users who dislike DRM is proving to be challenging, so the admins are shutting down and reopening Discord discussions day by day instead of keeping the server active always".

A 2024 study developed a mathematical model suggesting that, if Denuvo was cracked very early on after a game's release, within the first week, the effects of piracy resulted in an estimated revenue loss of 20%, as compared to a situation where Denuvo was not cracked. The study also found that, when Denuvo survives for at least 12 weeks, the effects of piracy on revenue become negligible, should the DRM be cracked later on. The study used reviews as a proxy for copies sold. The results therefore concern the estimated effect of the availability and timing of a crack relative to an uncracked counterfactual, rather than directly measuring the net effect of adopting Denuvo compared with releasing a game without DRM. It does not by itself establish that piracy has a negative effect on sales across the broader literature, or that deploying Denuvo produces a net increase in revenue compared with releasing a game without it.

== Anti-circumvention lawsuit ==
Before 2026, a user known as "voices38" successfully circumvented Denuvo's anti-tamper protections on newly released games and distributed the unauthorized copies online. In September 2026, Denuvo filed a lawsuit alleging that the user violated the anti-circumvention provisions of the U.S. Digital Millennium Copyright Act (DMCA). The suit aims to uncover the user's identity via their associated social media accounts. In response, voices38 publicly dismissed the legal threat and stated their intent to continue bypassing the company's protections.
