= Dotfuscator =

- Developers: Preemptive Solutions, LLC
- Initial release: April 2002; 24 years ago
- Stable release: 6.5.4 / 7 April 2023; 3 years ago
- Operating system: Windows, Linux, MacOS.
- Type: Code obfuscator
- License: Proprietary software
- Website: www.preemptive.com/products/dotfuscator

Dotfuscator is a software protection and obfuscation tool for applications built with .NET, C#, MAUI and Universal Windows Platform (UWP). Dotfuscator uses a multi-layered defense strategy that combines code obfuscation, encryption, code shrinking, and application hardening to make reverse engineering and tampering significantly harder.

Ordinarily, .NET executables typically retain a high level of metadata and intermediate language (IL) code, which can be analyzed or decompiled using free tools such as ILSpy, dotPeek and JustDecompile.

This can expose application logic, algorithms, intellectual property (trade secrets), licensing mechanisms, and security-related code. Applications can also be inspected at runtime through debugging tools. Dotfuscator is designed to reduce these risks by making code analysis, reverse engineering, and runtime tampering more difficult.

Dotfuscator was developed by PreEmptive. A free version, known as Dotfuscator Community Edition, has been distributed as part of Microsoft's Visual Studio..

A separate Dotfuscator Professional edition is also available under a commercial license, with a trial version offered by PreEmptive.
