= UPX =

Executable packer software

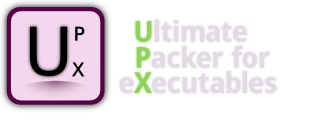
- Release: May 26, 1998; 28 years ago
- Stable release: 5.3.0 / October 28, 2026; 6 days ago
- Written in: C++, Assembly
- Operating system: Microsoft Windows, Linux, macOS, DOS, Atari TOS
- Platform: i386, MIPS, AMD64, ARM, PowerPC, m68k
- Available in: English
- Type: Executable compression
- License: GPL with exception for compressed executables, proprietary for compression algorithm in binary distributions
- Website: upx.github.io
- Repository: github.com/upx/upx

UPX (Ultimate Packer for eXecutables) is a free and open source executable packer supporting a number of file formats from different operating systems.

== Compression ==
UPX uses a data compression algorithm called UCL, which is an open-source implementation of portions of the proprietary NRV (Not Really Vanished) algorithm.

UCL has been designed to be simple enough that a decompressor can be implemented in just a few hundred bytes of code. UCL requires no additional memory to be allocated for decompression, a considerable advantage that means that a UPX packed executable usually requires no additional memory.

UPX (since 2.90 beta) can use LZMA on most platforms; however, this is disabled by default for 16-bit due to slow decompression speed on older computers (use --lzma to force it on).

Starting with version 3.91, UPX also supports 64-Bit (x64) PE files on the Windows platform. This feature is currently declared as experimental.

== Decompression ==
UPX supports two mechanisms for decompression: an in-place technique and extraction to temporary file.

The in-place technique, which decompresses the executable into memory, is not possible on all supported platforms. It has the advantage of being more efficient in terms of memory, and that the environment set up by the OS remains correct.

The rest uses extraction to temporary file. This procedure involves additional overhead and other disadvantages; however, it allows any executable file format to be packed. The extraction to temporary file method has several disadvantages:

- Special permissions are ignored, such as suid.
- argv[0] will not be meaningful.
- Multiple running instances of the executable are unable to share common segments.

Unmodified UPX packing is often detected and unpacked by antivirus software scanners. UPX also has a built-in feature for unpacking unmodified executables packed with itself.

== Supported formats ==
UPX supports the following formats:

- Portable Executable (PE, EXE and DLL files):
  - ARM (Windows CE)
  - 32-bit x86 (Windows Desktop)
  - 64-bit x86-64 (Windows Desktop, still experimental)
  - RTM32 (DOS extender, as generated by Borland C/Pascal compilers)
- COFF executables, used by DJGPP2
- a.out format, BSD i386 (removed)
- Raw 8086/DOS files: (Note: For the DOS targets, UPX supports a special option -8086 in order to force the embedded decompressor to become compatible with 8088/8086 processors, so that the compressed files can be executed and decompressed even on the earliest PCs running DOS.)
  - DOS/COM (including some binary images) (Note: The facility to compress DOS .COM-style files can be utilized also to compress other binary executable files. Some FreeDOS and EDR-DOS kernel files are known to be UPX-compressible this way.) (Note: The facility to compress DOS .COM-style files can be utilized also to compress non-executable binary data files, if the driver/application using these files has been enhanced to detect UPX-compressed files and jump to the decompressor embedded in the file. FreeDOS is known to utilize this for .CPX files, UPX-compressed .CPI font files.)
  - DOS/EXE
  - DOS/SYS
- Watcom/LE (used by DOS4G, PMODE/W, DOS32A and CauseWay)
- TMT/adam (as generated by the TMT Pascal compiler)
- Atari/TOS
- Linux kernel, i386, x86-64 and ARM
- Linux Executable and Linkable Format, i386, x86-64, ARM, PowerPC, MIPS
- PlayStation 1/EXE (MIPS R3000)
- Darwin Mach-O, ppc32, i386, and x86-64

UPX does not currently support PE files containing CIL code intended to run on the .NET Framework.
