= Igor Muttik =

Russian computer scientist (born 1962)

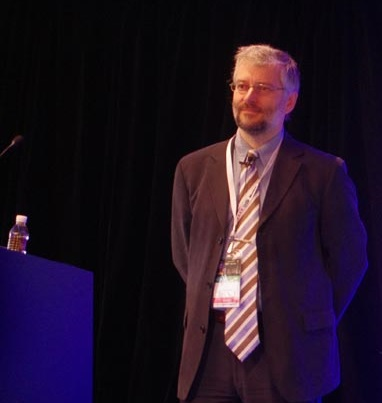
- Igor Muttik of McAfee (Part of Intel Security)
- Born: 1962 (age 63–64); Russia

Igor Muttik (born 1962 in Russia) is a computer security expert, researcher and inventor.

== Career ==
Igor Muttik is a Senior Principal Research Architect with McAfee which is part of Intel Corporation since 2011. He started researching computer malware in 1980s when anti-virus industry was in its infancy. Muttik holds a PhD in physics and mathematics from the Moscow State University. He has been a member of CARO (Computer Antivirus Research Organization) since 1994, and worked as a virus researcher for Dr. Solomon's Software. Since 1998 Muttik was running McAfee’s anti-malware research in EMEA and switched to his architectural role in 2002.

In 2008 he was one of the co-founders of AMTSO (Anti-Malware Testing Standards Organization) and was on the Board of AMTSO for 3 years. Muttik was also a co-founder of Industry Connections Security Group (ICSG is part of IEEE) - he is the chair of the taggant system working group, vice-chair of the ICSG and CMX (clean file metadata exchange) working groups. The taggant system and CMX are both part of AMSS (Anti-Malware Support Service).

He is a regular speaker at major international security conferences like Black Hat Briefings, RSA Conference, DEF CON, Virus Bulletin, EICAR. Muttik lives in the UK

Muttik is a visiting professor at the Information Security Group at Royal Holloway, University of London. He is heading McAfee's work for the security research of mobile devices funded by EPSRC:

- MobSec
- ACID and
- AppGuarden projects.

His current work is focused on the architecture of security solutions for smart devices and on hardware-assisted security technologies.

== See also ==
- Antivirus software
- Dr Solomon's Antivirus
- CARO
- EICAR
