= New Executable =

File format in early Windows and OS/2

- Filename extension: .exe, .dll, .fon, .drv
- Type of format: Executable, dynamic-link library
- Extended from: DOS MZ executable

The New Executable (NE or NewEXE) is a 16-bit executable file format, a successor to the DOS MZ executable format. It was used in Windows 1.0–3.x, Windows 9x, multitasking MS-DOS 4.0, OS/2 1.x, and the OS/2 subset of Windows NT up to version 5.0 (Windows 2000). An NE is also called a segmented executable. It utilizes the 16-bit protected mode or unreal mode, and it can be 16-bit and 32-bit hybrid.

== History ==
The first product to be released using the New Executable format was Windows 1.0 in 1985, followed by the 1986 multitasking MS-DOS 4.0, which was a separate branch of MS-DOS development, released between mainstream MS-DOS versions 3.2 and 3.3, and sometimes referred to as "European MS-DOS 4.0".

The Portable Executable (PE) format replaced NE format in 32-bit and 64-bit versions of Windows, while Linear Executables (LX) replaced NE for 32-bit programs in OS/2. VxD in Windows 9x also use LE format.

== Compatibility ==
While designed for 16-bit OSes, NE executables can be run on 32-bit Windows. Beginning with Windows Vista, icon resources inside New Executables are not extracted and shown even by the 32-bit shell. 64-bit versions of Windows completely lack native support for running NE executables, because 64-bit Windows cannot run 16-bit programs on the processor without the help of an emulator.

Due to the rare and fairly complex nature of these files, only a few .EXE packers support it: WinLite, PackWin, PKLite 2.01, and SLR Optloader or NeLite for OS/2. The NE format is also still used as (non-executable) container for .fon Microsoft Windows bitmapped fonts.

=== DOS stub ===
New (NE), linear (LX), and portable (PE) executables retain the DOS MZ format file header for backward compatibility with DOS. When run under DOS, a so-called DOS stub is executed which usually prints "This program cannot be run in DOS mode" or "This program requires Microsoft Windows" and exits. This constitutes a minimal form of a so-called fat binary.

== See also ==
- COM file
