= JFT =

JFT may refer to:

- Job File Table, a data structure in DOS-compatible operating systems
- Johnson–Forest Tendency, an American Trotskyist organization
- Jones Falls Trail, in Baltimore, Maryland, United States
- Mazda J engine
