= Roeper School (Michigan) =

The Roeper School

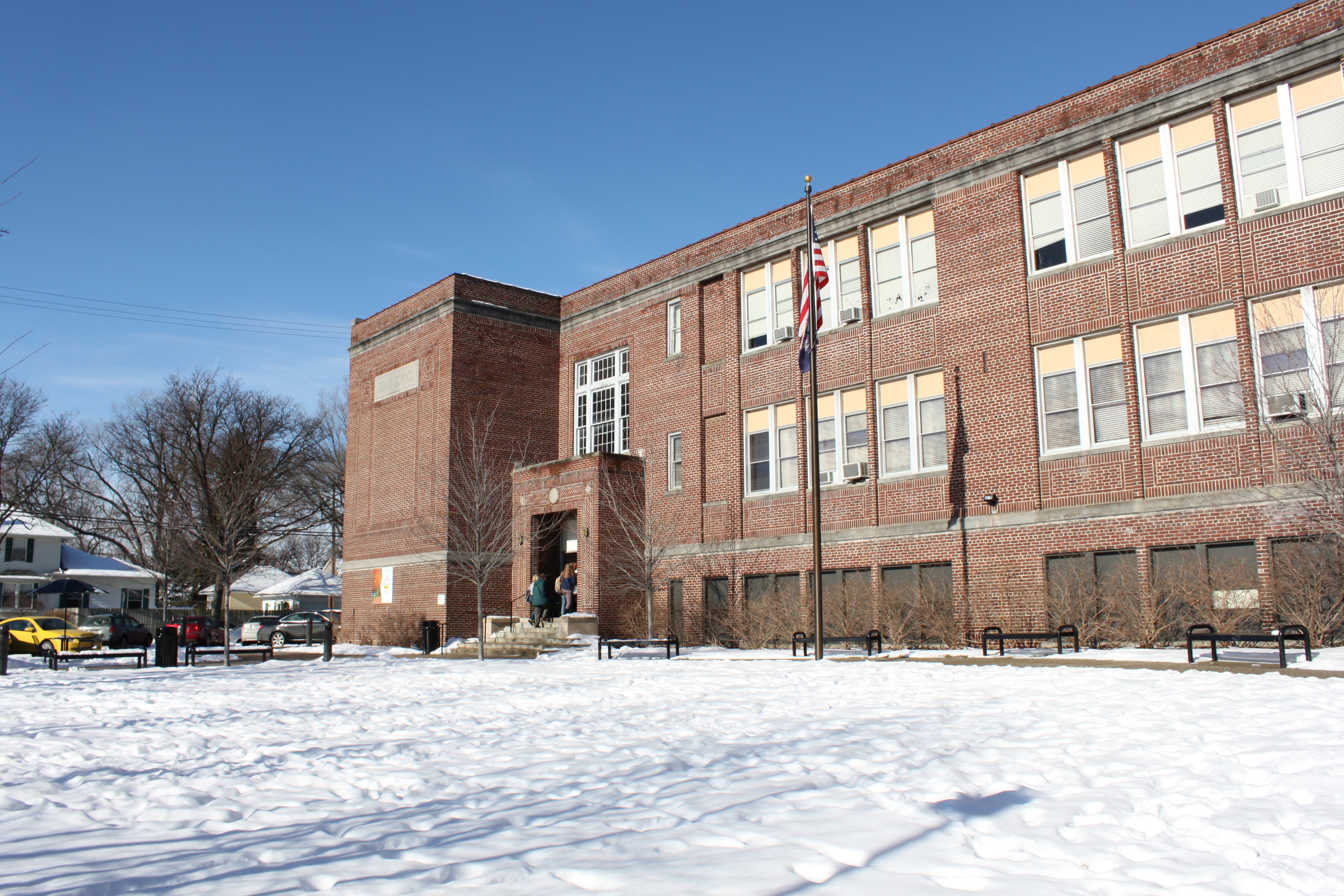

Location
- 41190 Woodward Avenue; Bloomfield Hills, Michigan; United States

Information
- Type: Private Co-educational
- Opened: 1941
- Founder: George and Annemarie Roeper
- Head of school: Anne Glass
- Grades: PreK-12
- Colors: red, black and white
- Athletics conference: MIAC
- Nickname: Roughriders
- Rivals: Oakland Christian, Southfield Christian
- Publication: The Muse literary magazine
- Newspaper: Tuna Talk
- Website: www.roeper.org

The Roeper School is a private coeducational day school with campuses in Birmingham and Bloomfield Hills, Michigan, in Greater Detroit, serving students at all levels from preschool through the 12th grade. It was formerly known as Roeper City and Country School.

== History ==
The Roeper School was founded in 1941 by George and Annemarie Roeper, who were forced to flee Nazi Germany. At the time the Roepers fled Europe, Annemarie had been invited by Anna Freud to be her protégé and had completed her first year of medical school.

Together the Roepers founded the school intending it to be a place that, by teaching personal motivation and encouraging critical thinking skills and analysis, would educate children who would not follow leadership blindly as they believed had happened to many people in interwar Germany. It was also hoped the children would come to recognize the inherent dignity of every individual and not harbor prejudice.

The school first moved to the Bloomfield Hills campus (42°35′34.1″N 83°15′07.7″W) in 1946. It was designated a school for gifted children in 1956. In 1965, the Upper School (high school) program was added. In 1981, the middle and upper schools moved to the former Adams Elementary School in Birmingham, Michigan, (42°33′00.8″N 83°12′23.6″W), thereby creating two campuses. The Capital Campaign fundraising initiative began in the mid-nineties and has provided the school with its largest investment in new facilities, including a new elementary school classroom building that sits adjacent to the new community center that houses the school's first full-size gymnasium, and the lower school's first large choir and band rooms.

== Notable alumni ==
- Flavia Colgan, political activist and analyst
- Tiffany P. Cunningham, a United States Circuit Judge of the United States Court of Appeals for the Federal Circuit
- John Marshall Jones, actor
- Sharon LaFraniere (class of 1973), journalist
- Dwayne McDuffie, comic book and animation writer
- Richard R. Murray, founder of Equity Schools
- Susan Shapiro, author and writing teacher
- Angela V. Shelton, actress and comedian
- Bahni Turpin, actress and audiobook narrator
- Matt Wayne, television and comic book writer
- Kayden Pierre, professional soccer player
- Charlie White (class of 2005), Olympic ice dancer
- Mark Zbikowski (class of 1974), Microsoft programmer, designer of the DOS executable file format
- Daniel Kahn, Yiddish scholar and Klezmer musician.
- Randall Woolf, composer
