= 4096 =

4096 may refer to:

- 4096 (number), a power of two
- 4096 (computer virus), a DOS file virus
