= Skyline High School (Utah) =

Location
- 3251 East 3760 South; Millcreek, Utah; United States; 40°41′24″N 111°48′04″W

Information
- Type: Public high school
- Motto: R-I-S-E
- Established: 1962
- School district: Granite School District
- Principal: Robert Mcdaniel
- Teaching staff: 77.65 (FTE)
- Grades: 9–12
- Enrollment: 2,125 (2023–2024)
- Student to teacher ratio: 27.37
- Campus size: 0.15 km² (0.06 mi²)
- Campus type: Suburb
- Color
- Mascot: Eagle
- Rival: Olympus High
- Website: Official website

Skyline High School is a public high school in Millcreek, Utah, United States. Skyline High School serves ninth, tenth, eleventh, and twelfth graders. The school opened in 1962 and is administered by the Granite School District.

Admission to Skyline High School is open enrollment. Students are neither required to take an admission exam nor need to live within the boundaries set by the administering district. Academically, it is one of only seven Utah schools to offer the IB Diploma Program, along with Hillcrest High School, and West High School. Skyline's music and drama programs have received statewide recognition. The debate program is also ranked at the region and state levels. Since the school's establishment, fourteen Skyline students have been selected as US Presidential Scholars.

== Location and campus ==
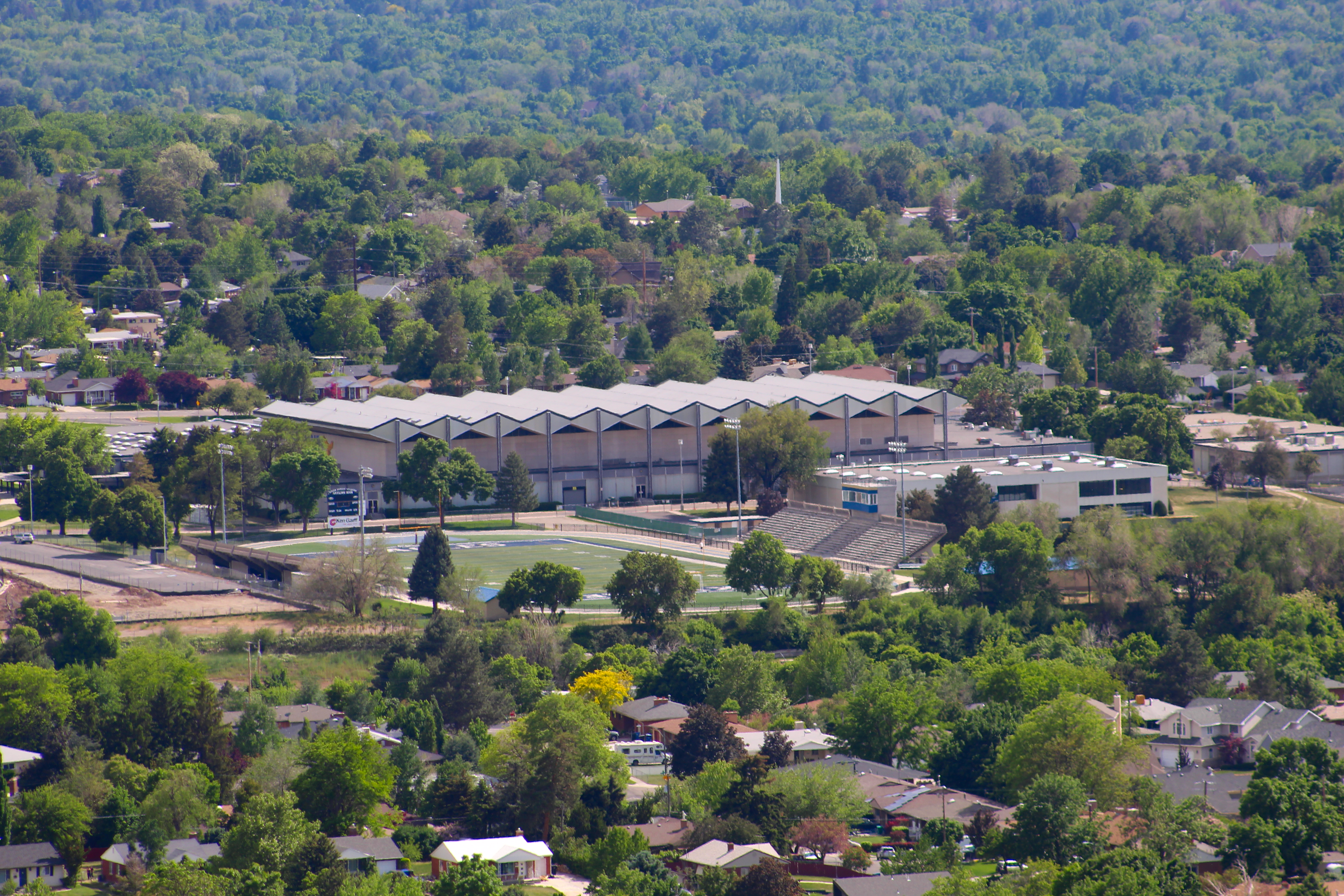
Skyline, as seen from Grandeur Peak

Originally built in 1962, the Skyline High School is a 0.15 km² (0.06 mi²) medium-sized campus located at the mouth of Millcreek Canyon, just west of I-215. It includes soccer, softball, baseball, and football fields, as well as tennis courts. The school has 677 student parking stalls, and 28 faculty only parking stalls.

The campus is divided into six different buildings: A, B, C, D, a preschool, and an auxiliary gym/pool. The A building is the main academic building, and with 63 classrooms, it is the largest building on the campus. The B building has a cafeteria, auditorium, gym, and three classrooms, while the C and D buildings include seven classrooms and an auto shop.

== Athletics ==
Skyline High School's athletic program includes 37 teams covering 22 sports. The teams are known as the "Skyline Eagles" and are a part of the Utah High School Activities Association. Skyline has an athletic rivalry with neighboring Olympus High School.

=== Football ===
When the school was first established in 1962, many of the incoming seniors were given the choice of remaining at their old school, Olympus High School, or moving to the new school, Skyline. Because most of the seniors chose to remain at Olympus High, the majority of Skyline's 1963 football team was made up of sophomores and juniors. The first year was difficult for Skyline, but by the late sixties the football program had improved and had won two state championships in 1967 and 1969. Throughout the seventies Skyline's football program continued to be successful and won four state championships in 1970, 1976, 1977, and 1979. During this period Skyline was led by head coach Ken Schmidt, who later became the defensive coordinator for the BYU Cougars, and assistant coach Ron Haun.

In the 1990s, Skyline's football program was led by head coach Roger Dupaix and played once again in the state playoffs. In 1999, Skyline football won a fifth consecutive 5A state title and was ranked 24th in the nation by USA Today. Overall, the Eagles have been football state champions fourteen times (1967, 1969, 1970, 1976, 1977, 1979, 1990, 1993, 1995, 1996, 1997, 1998, 1999, and 2005). In 2005 the team went into the playoffs as the fourth-ranked team in the region, where they rallied to win four straight games, beating rival Brighton High School in the state championship game.

Skyline's rivals are the Olympus Titans, a rivalry known as one of the state's greatest. The two schools play for a traveling trophy known as "The Rock". This football-shaped rock is painted the colors of the winning school and is displayed in the school's trophy case until the two teams meet up next. The series is currently tied 27-27-1, with Olympus having a one game advantage on victories in the rivalry game; Skyline has a playoff victory, hence the overall tie.

=== Basketball ===
Skyline won state basketball championships in 1976 and 1977. The 1977 team was ranked nationally as the fifth-best team in America, with a record of 26-1.

=== Women's tennis ===
Skyline's women's tennis team has been state champions for three consecutive years in 2009-5A, 2010-5A, and 2011-4A; they took second in 2008-5A. Skyline was one of the original 5A schools, when 5A was established in Utah in 1993, but due to decreasing student enrollment, was moved to the 4A program in 2011.

=== Lacrosse ===
Skyline's lacrosse team had its inaugural season as an independent team in the spring of 1997. Due to a lack of participation in 1996, they competed jointly with Brighton High School. The team has been a contender for the state championship on a number of occasions. In 2005 Skyline won the state championship.

=== Track and field ===
In 2006, 2008, and 2009 Skyline won the 4x800 meter relay at the Davis High School Track and Field Invitational. The cross country team won their 5A region, both boys' and girls' teams, in 2009. Class of 2020 graduate Thomas Boyden set a then state record of 4:05 in the 1600 meters, before going on to have a successful career at Stanford

=== Ice hockey ===
Skyline's hockey team won the 2010 state championship over Viewmont High School, and went on to finish in the top 15 at the USA Hockey High School National Championships held in Chicago, Illinois. The hockey team repeated the win in 2011 in a 3-2 overtime victory over Bingham High School.

=== Wrestling ===
Skyline's wrestling team went undefeated in region duals for three years (2006–09).

=== Water polo ===
Skyline men have won state titles 2020, 2021, 2022, and 2023, a renewal of the team's past successes. Skyline men and women won state titles in water polo three years in a row (2002, 2003, and 2004), under coach Rod Horton.

=== Baseball ===
Skyline's baseball team won the 1991 American Legion State Championship. Skyline won the state championship in 2012.

=== Soccer ===
Skyline's men's soccer team won the 4A state championship in 2014 and 2015.

== Academics ==
Skyline is one of just seven schools in Utah to offer the IB Diploma Programme, along with Hillcrest High School, Bountiful High School, West High School, Clearfield High School, Highland High School, and Provo High School. It is also the only school in the Granite School District to offer this program.

Skyline High School was ranked as the number 5 high school and number 1 traditional public school in the state of Utah by US News in 2020.

Skyline's math team has repeatedly earned recognition at a state and national level. In the 2009 Team Scramble competition, Skyline tied for thirteenth place nationally, and placed fourteenth nationally in the 2009 Ciphering Time Trials competition. In the 2010 Four-by-Four competition, Skyline also placed fourteenth, and four Skyline students placed third nationally in the Scissors Division. In the 2008–2009 Mandelbrot Team Play Competition, Skyline tied for eleventh place nationally. In the 2010 Utah State Math Contest, Skyline placed first in the 12th grade for the 5A category, and individual Skyline students placed first in 10th grade and first and second in 12th grade.

Skyline garnered much attention in November 2012 for being the first high school in the world to participate in SC's Student Cluster Competition in the LittleFe Track. They took home an honorable mention for "coming out of nowhere and taking the lead for a significant amount of time". They competed against universities, including the University of Utah and Slippery Rock University from Pennsylvania.

== Newspaper ==
Skyline's school newspaper is The Horizon, a quarterly printed publication, with new articles on their website once a week. The staff generally consists of six editors and numerous staff writers. The Horizon has four sections: news, opinion, feature, and sports.

== Renovation (2019–present) ==
Early construction on the baseball field in May 2020

In May 2019, the Granite School District announced a site layout for a rebuild of Skyline High School. Beginning in November 2019 and scheduled to end in December 2025, the school will be rebuilt while still in session. The school will include new grass and turf fields, tennis courts, pool, stadium, and baseball stadium, as well as a renovated softball field.

== Notable alumni ==
- Tony Bergstrom, NFL football player for Washington Redskins
- Justin Braun, soccer player for Major League Soccer team Real Salt Lake
- Algie Brown, football player
- John Curtis, junior United States senator from Utah
- Brandon Doman, BYU and San Francisco 49ers quarterback, offensive coordinator and quarterbacks coach at BYU
- Dan Farr, Salt Lake Comic Con co-founder
- Jared Goldberg, Olympic skier
- Shalaya Kipp, middle distance runner, 2012 Summer Olympics, 3000 meter steeplechase
- Gretchen W. McClain, CEO of Xylem Inc. and former NASA deputy associate administrator for space development
- Craig Richard Nelson, Broadway and Hollywood actor, director, and singer
- Tenny Palepoi, NFL player for Los Angeles Chargers
- J. A. C. Redford, Hollywood musician and composer
- George Theodore, American baseball player for New York Mets
- Danny Vranes, All-American University of Utah and Philadelphia 76ers basketball player
- Sharlene Wells Hawkes, Miss America 1985
- Peter Yanowitz, drummer for The Wallflowers, Natalie Merchant, and Morningwood
- Becky Douglas, Philanthropist and founder of Rising Star Outreach
- Steve Clark, Miami Dolphins football player

== Gallery ==
Main south entrance (May 2020)

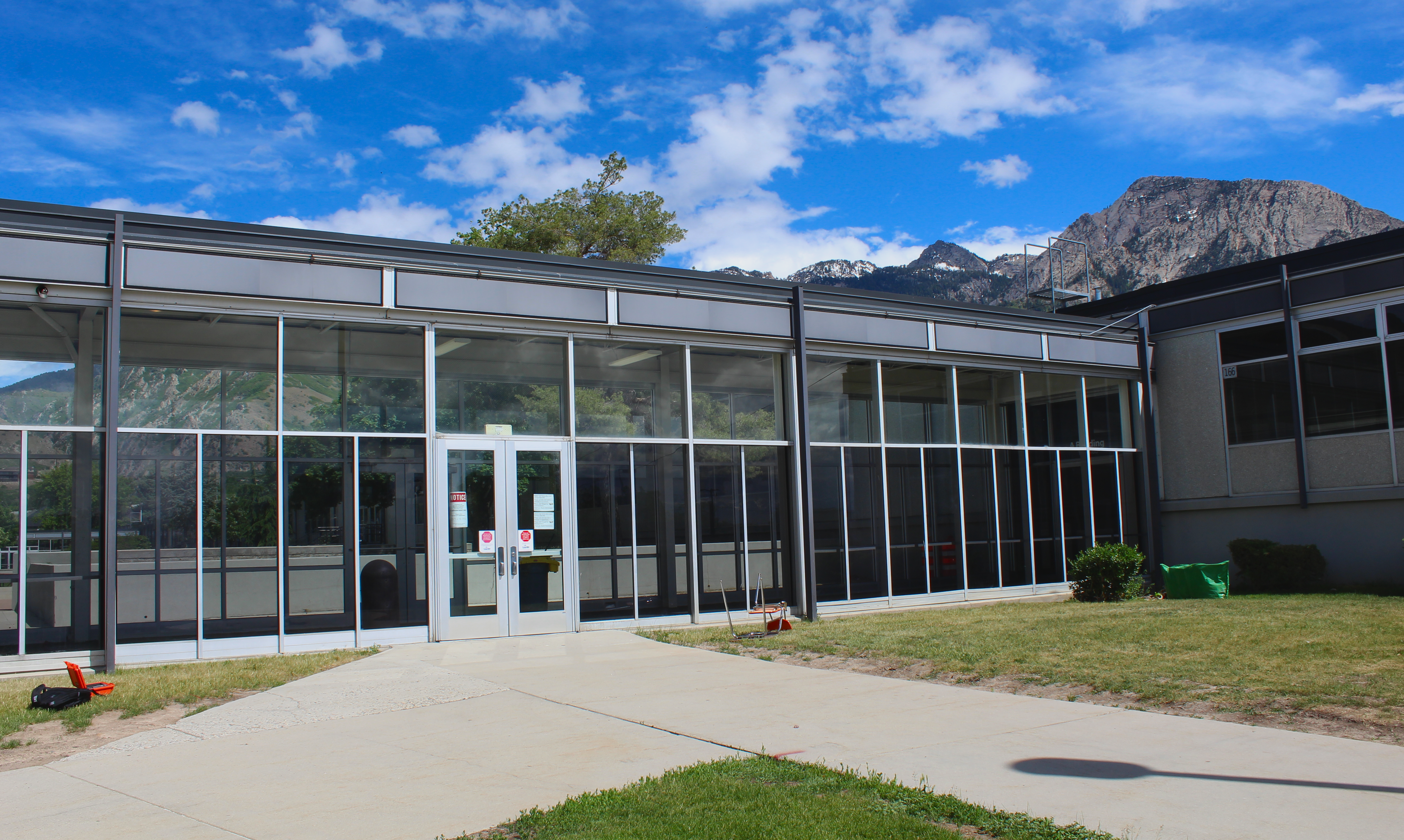
West glass hallway (May 2020)

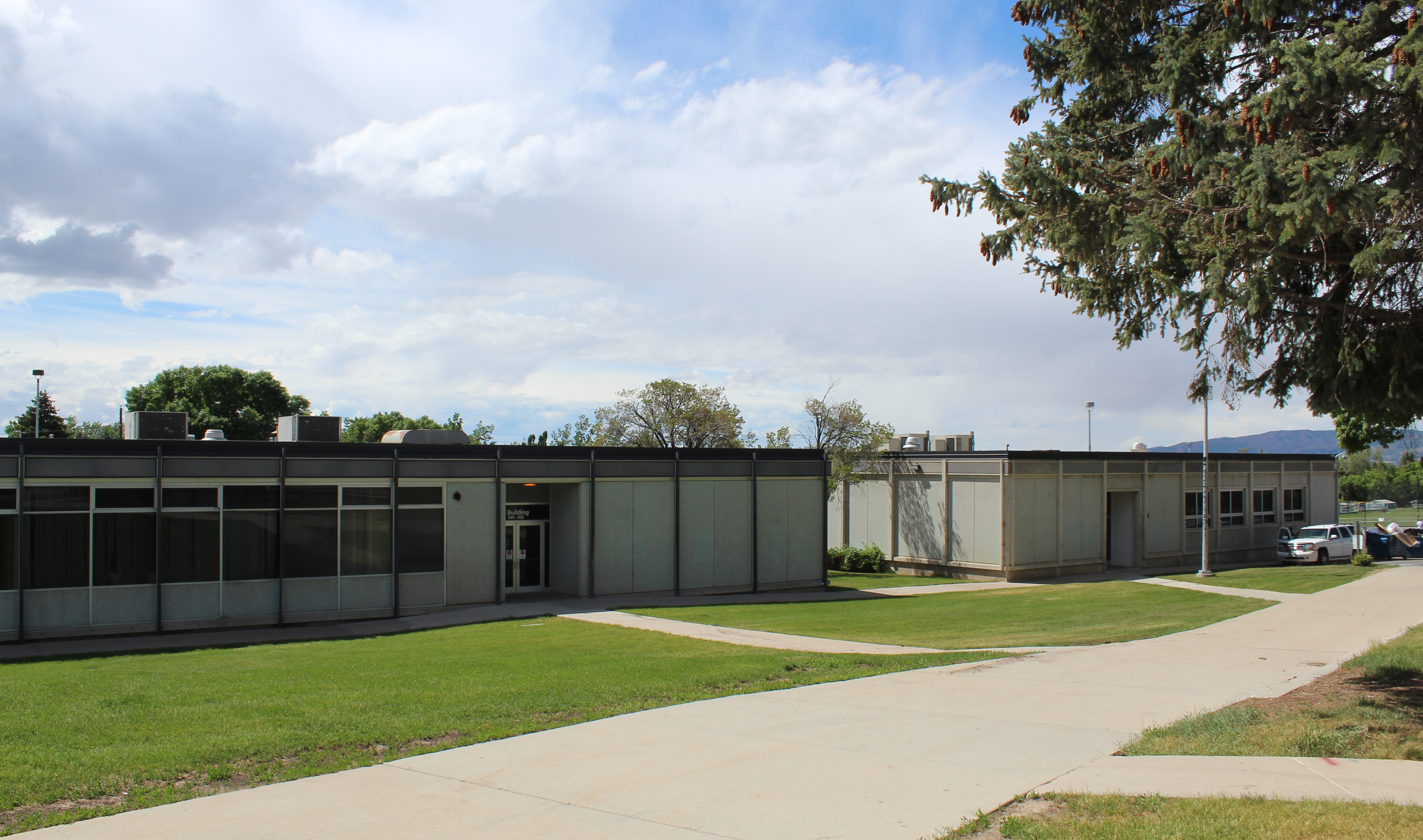
External C and D buildings (May 2020)

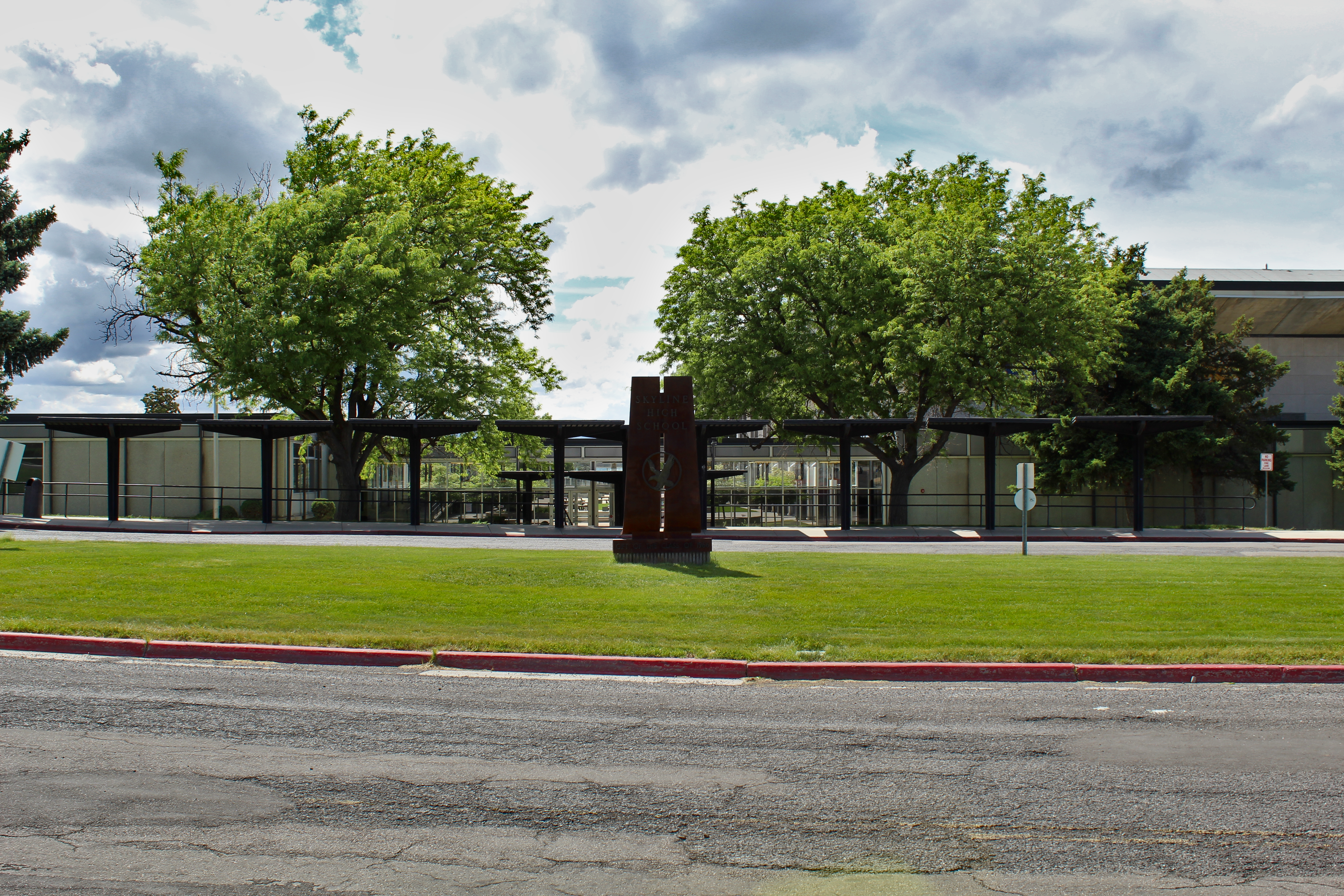
East drop-off area (May 2020)

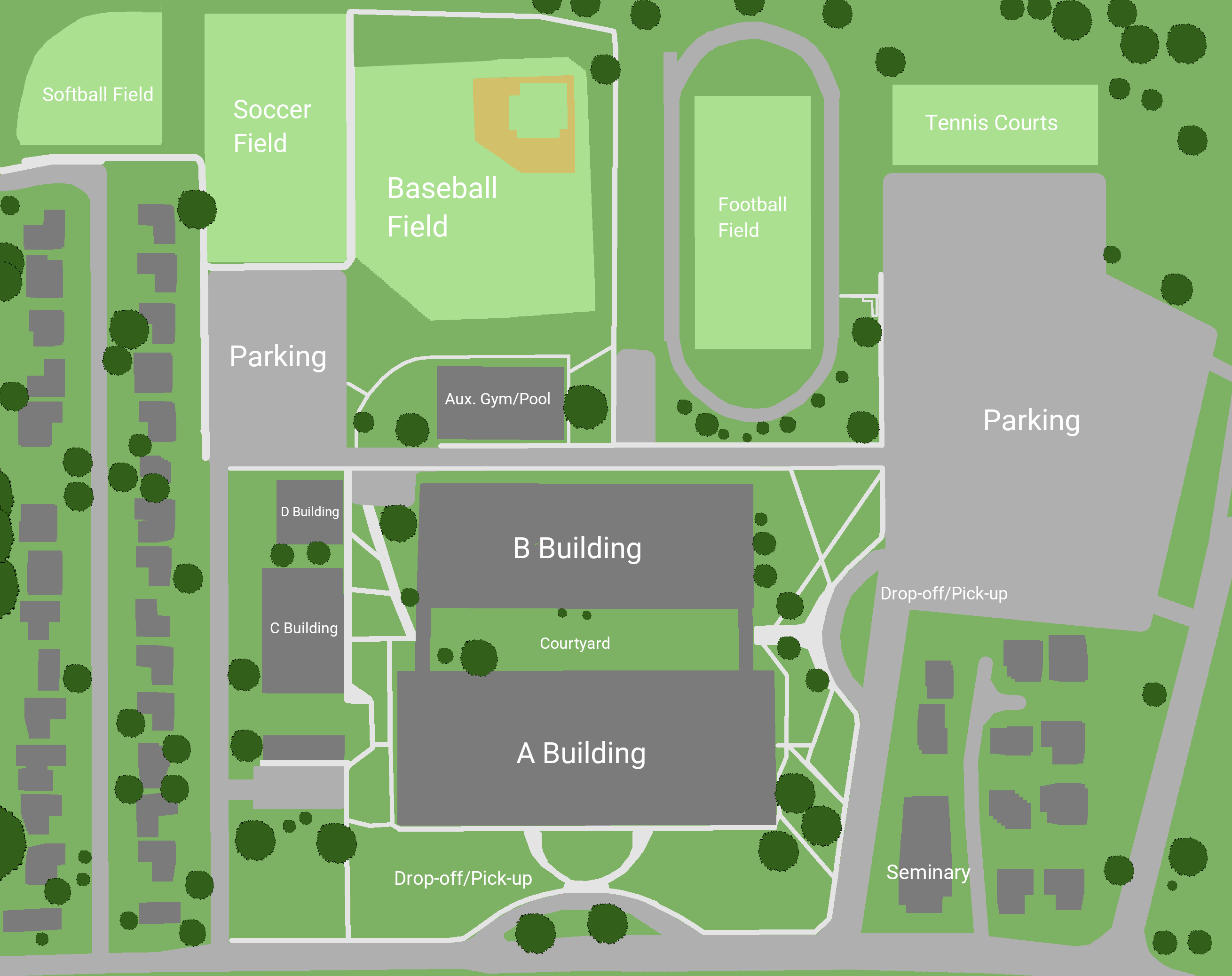
Campus map

Floor map

== See also ==
- List of high schools in Utah
