= List of United States regional mathematics competitions =

Many math competitions in the United States have regional restrictions. Of these, most are statewide.

For a more complete list, please visit here .

The contests include:

== Alabama ==
- Alabama Statewide High School Mathematics Contest
- Virgil Grissom High School Math Tournament
- Vestavia Hills High School Math Tournament

== Arizona ==
- Great Plains Math League
- AATM State High School Contest

== California ==
- Bay Area Math Olympiad
- Berkeley Math Tournament
- Lawrence Livermore National Laboratories Annual High School Math Challenge
- Cal Poly Math Contest and Trimathlon
- Polya Competition
- Bay Area Math Meet
- College of Creative Studies Math Competition
- LA Math Cup
- Math Day at the Beach hosted by CSULB
- Math Field Day for San Diego Middle Schools
- Mesa Day Math Contest at UC Berkeley
- Santa Barbara County Math Superbowl
- Pomona College Mathematical Talent Search
- Redwood Empire Mathematics Tournament hosted by Humboldt State (middle and high school)
- San Diego Math League and San Diego Math Olympiad hosted by the San Diego Math Circle
- Santa Clara University High School Mathematics Contest
- Southern California Mathematics Competition, hosted at USC
- Stanford Mathematics Tournament
- UCSD/GSDMC High School Honors Mathematics Contest

== Colorado ==
- Colorado Mathematics Olympiad

== District of Columbia ==
- Moody's Mega Math

== Florida ==
- Florida-Stuyvesant Alumni Mathematics Competition
- David Essner Mathematics Competition
- James S. Rickards High School Fall Invitational
- FAMAT Regional Competitions:
- January Regional
- February Regional
- March Regional
- FGCU Math Competition

== Georgia ==
- Central Math Meet(grades 9 - 12)
- GA Council of Teachers of Mathematics State Varsity Math Tournament
- STEM Olympiads Of America Math, Science & Cyber Olympiads (grades 3 - 8)
- Valdosta State University Middle Grades Mathematics Competition

== Illinois ==
- ICTM math contest (grades 3–12)

== Indiana ==
- [IUPUI High School Math Contest] (grades 9–12)
- Huntington University Math Competition (grades 6–12)
- Indiana Math League
- IASP Academic Super Bowl
- Rose-Hulman High School Mathematics Contest (grades 9–12)
- Trine University Math Competition

== Iowa ==
- Great Plains Math League

== Kansas ==
- Great Plains Math League

== Louisiana ==
- Louisiana State University Mathematics Contest for high school students

== Maine ==
- Pi-Cone South Math League
- Maine Association of Math Leagues

== Maryland ==
- The University of Maryland High School Mathematics Competition
- The Eastern Shore High School Mathematics Competition
- Maryland Trig-Star
- Maryland Math League
- JHU Math Competition
- Montgomery Blair Math Tournament

== Massachusetts ==
- Harvard–MIT Mathematics Tournament
- Worcester Polytechnic Institute Mathematics Meet
- Massachusetts Mathematics Olympiad
- Greater Boston Mathematics League
- Massachusetts Mathematics League
- Southeastern Massachusetts Mathematics League
- Southern Massachusetts Conference Mathematics League
- Western Massachusetts Mathematics League
- Worcester County Mathematics League
- Intermediate Math League of Eastern Massachusetts
- Lexington Mathematics Tournament
- Winchester Mathematics Competition

== Michigan ==
- Lower Michigan Mathematics Competition (college)
- Michigan Autumn Take Home (college)
- Michigan Mathematics Prize Competition (high school)

== Minnesota ==
- St. Cloud State University Math Competition

== Missouri ==
- KCATM Math Contests (grades 3–12)
- Missouri Council of Teachers of Mathematics Math Contests (grades 4–12)
- Great Plains Math League

== New Jersey ==
- WWPMT (West Windsor-Plainsboro Math Tournament) (grades 3–8)

== New York ==
- Nassau County Interscholastic Mathematics League
- New York City Interscholastic Mathematics League
- New York State Mathematics League
- New York Math League
- Suffolk County Math Tournament

== North Carolina ==
- Duke University Math Math Meet
- North Carolina State High School Math Contest

== Ohio ==
- Ohio Council of Teachers of Mathematics (OCTM) State Contest
- Ohio Mathematics Invitational Olympiad (OHMIO)

== Oklahoma ==
- OSU High School Math Contest

== Pennsylvania ==
- Lehigh University/AT&T High School Math Contest (discontinued, now held as the Lehigh Valley ARML TST)

== Rhode Island ==
- Rhode Island Math League

== South Carolina ==
- Clemson Calculus Challenge
- Coastal Carolina University Math Competition
- College of Charleston Math Meet
- Florence-Darlington Tech Math Competition
- Furman University Wylie Mathematics Tournament
- Pee-Dee Regional High-School Mathematics Tournament
- University of South Carolina High School Math Contest
- USC Aiken Math Competition
- USC Upstate Math Competition
- Wando High Mu Alpha Theta Tournament

== Texas ==
- Rice Mathematics Tournament
- Texas A&M University Mathematics Tournament
- Texas Academy of Mathematics and Science Tournament

== Utah ==
- Utah Math Olympiad
- Utah State Math Contest
- Snow College Math Contest
- Intermountain Math Competition

== Virginia ==
- Christopher Newport University Regional High School Mathematics

== Washington ==
- Washington State Math Championship
- Northwest Math Championship
- Math is Cool Championships
- Math is Cool Masters
- Mount Rainier Mathematics Invitational
- Washington State Mu Alpha Theta
- Knights of Pi Math Tournament (KPMT)
- Interlake Invitational Math Contest (I^{2}MC)
- WSMA Math Bowl

== Wisconsin ==
- Wisconsin Mathematics, Engineering, and Science Talent Search

== West Virginia ==
- West Virginia State Math Field Day
