= CALL 5 =

CALL 5 may refer to:

- CALL 5 (CP/M), the API function entry point into the BDOS in the zero page under CP/M-80 and compatible systems
- CALL 5 (DOS), an API entry point into some CP/M-compatible BDOS functions in the PSP under DOS compatible systems
