= 4K (computer virus) =

Malware details
- Alias: Frodo
- Type: DOS
- Subtype: COM, EXE
- Classification: Virus
- Isolation date: October 1989

4K, also known as 4096, is a computer virus which infects COM files and EXE files. The virus was one of the first file infectors to employ stealth tactics. systems will hang, after September 22 every year, which is also the date of birth of Bilbo Baggins, a character from The Lord of the Rings. The code was intended to display the message Frodo Lives, but hangs in all known variants.

This virus was spread without the aid of the Internet. It was ported between systems by floppy disks.

== History ==
4K was first isolated in October 1989. The first U.S. specimen was contracted in Dallas, TX, and quarantined with verification given by antivirus professionals. Reporters and TV crews recorded this in the local area news in August 1990. Its trail led from Dallas back to New York City via a professional at a software firm creating software for lawyers. Virus firms had been tracking it previously in London a month or two before getting calls from New York. No specimens were quarantined or properly recorded in New York.

Raymond Glath of Phoenix, AZ was the developer and owner of the Vi-Spy product, which continued production until mid-release of Windows 95. Reports to McAfee antivirus and Vi-Spy antivirus firms resulted in only one product properly detecting the virus, Vi-Spy.

== Operation ==
4K added itself to the system in a way that defied normal infection processes. Because of this, it was able to infect a system without using system subroutines, which is what most antivirus products were watching. This is why the virus received the additional name 'stealth'. The infection process used a mathematical algorithm to determine the letters E-X-E & C-O-M. When a file was opened by the OS, the virus checked the extension of the file, and sometimes, other extension letters would be identified as a program file, causing the virus to infect a data file and obviously corrupting its contents.

Because the virus appended itself to a file, while hiding the increase in file length, the system could cross-link files, and diagnostics on the disks would report allocation errors. This would damage programs and data alike. The description of the problems found while trying to correct the 'stupid-looking errors' would cause most computer professionals to erase the system and start over. A few days later, the problems would arise again. Diagnostic disks and writable installation disks used to fix the computer would commonly be infected with the virus, and this would aid in the spread.
