= Handkerchief (video game) =

2000 video game

- Wordmark of the game with blue butterfly symbol
- Developer(s): Opus Corp. (Japan)
- Publisher(s): Xsiv Games
- Platform(s): Microsoft Windows (32-bit)
- Release: 2000
- Genre(s): Adventure, Strategy
- Mode(s): Single player, Multiplayer

Handkerchief is a 2D jump and run shooter video game developed by OPUS Corp. and published by Xsiv Games for Microsoft Windows in the year 2000. It is characterized by the conversion of enemy soldiers into troops, capturing machines for mobility and combined weaponry, unlocking pathways, strategically purchasing health refills and ammunition at in-stage vending machines, and multiple boss fights with distinct battle stages.

The game has 25 levels in its single-player mission mode, and is equipped with multiplayer mode.

== Plot and story ==
The protagonist Jacob Streiker is fed up with the political situation in his country, taken over by mutant animals. Jacob's neighbours conform instead of questioning and resisting, thus rebelling on his own is Jacob's only hope of saving the country.

The game starts with the country's leader visiting Jacob's house and demolishing it, upon which he seeks to revolt.

== Multiplayer mode ==
Up to four users can play together through IPX and TCP/IP.

== Technical ==
The game's executeable file is named "HDKWIN.EXE", and it uses .BMP format for sprites and .WAV format for audio. There are ten save state slots. The game also makes use of parallax scrolling.

A demoware version was released as well.
