= Richard R. Murray =

Richard R. Murray (born February 3, 1956, in Bay City, Michigan) is an American entrepreneur, educator, and real estate expert who founded Equity Schools. He also invented of the school model upon which the Cristo Rey Network is based. He is also recognized for creating Nonlinear Project Funding to support education and other social causes, often including school formation, operations, and capital finance.

== Early years and education ==
Murray was born in Bay City, Michigan, in 1956. His grandfather, Dr. William S. Murray, was an inventor, Colgate University Trustee, and founder of the Indium Corporation, which today is a global business operating in eight countries. From his mother's side, Murray's family also included George Ross, who was a signatory of the Declaration of Independence and the uncle of Betsy Ross.

Murray developed his interest in and philosophy of school development while attending The Roeper School, where he was influenced by George Roeper’s views on education and human rights. The Roeper Institute published a 2021 interview with him in the Roeper Review in which he described Nonlinear thinking and process, including "The 17 Rules for Nonlinear Funding," and noting a casual connection with chaos theory. His education includes The University of Michigan, (B.A. and Rackham Graduate School), and Loyola University Chicago School of Law (J.D.) with additional legal studies at London School of Economics and University of Salzburg. He has taught at the high school, undergraduate college, and graduate levels.

== Career ==
Richard Murray is an inventor of school operating models and a developer of school facilities. Murray's most notable work was the invention of the school model upon which Cristo Rey Jesuit High School of Chicago is based. Cristo Rey is an urban, college preparatory school for low-income students that features an internship program in which students work one day per week in professional, entry-level positions in Chicago’s central business district. Many media have featured the school including the television news program 60 Minutes, national publication Newsweek, and a book about the school’s development. Nearly 40 other schools in the United States have been based on this model and more are in formation, also known as the Equity School model. Many of these schools are affiliated with the Cristo Rey Network which promotes and supports replication of the model.

He also is known for creating the public-private operating model in 2005 used by Wartburg College and Waverly, Iowa, for the wellness center there, known as “the W,” one of the largest NCAA Division III centers in the country. In 2007 Murray invented another high school operating model for The Neighborhood Academy in Pittsburgh, Pennsylvania, providing that college preparatory high school for low-income students with the means to develop a new campus.

More recently, working with a K-8 school serving one of Detroit's lowest income communities, in 2022 his firm completed transforming the school and its 12-acre campus into "an academic and athletic showpiece." An award-winning short documentary about the Detroit project was released in late 2023, "Natural Light: Transforming a School on East Eight Mile.

In 2020, he also created the plans and financing strategy for a new construction K-8 public school in an underserved community in Illinois, which the school district unanimously approved in 2022. Nonlinear Project Funding allowed both the Detroit and Illinois school projects to be developed without using tax referendums, or raising taxes, or relying on fundraising.

Internationally, Murray has been applying his Nonlinear Funding to support access to higher education in Africa by means of his funding mechanism involving a recent U.S. excise tax.

He also founded the Next Generation Benefit Company which will provide young U.S. families with the first new college savings method since 1997.

== Human rights ==
Murray’s views on human rights led to his activism with helping develop during the mid-1990s a refugee center for Chicago’s 30,000 member Bosnian community, publishing the law article "Compensating the World's Landmine Victims: Legal Liability and Anti-Personnel Landmine Producers" and taking roles with the American Refugee Committee, the Center for International Human Rights at Northwestern University School of Law, and Human Rights Watch.
