= Program Segment Prefix =

Data structure in DOS

The Program Segment Prefix (PSP) is a data structure used in DOS systems to store the state of a program. It resembles the Zero Page in the CP/M operating system. The PSP has the following structure:

Offset	Size	Contents
00h–01h	2 bytes (code)	CP/M-80-like exit (always contains INT 20h)
02h–03h	word (2 bytes)	Segment of the first byte beyond the memory allocated to the program
04h	byte	Reserved
05h–09h	5 bytes (code)	CP/M-80-like far call entry into DOS, and program segment size
0Ah–0Dh	dword (4 bytes)	Terminate address of previous program (old INT 22h)
0Eh–11h	dword	Break address of previous program (old INT 23h)
12h–15h	dword	Critical error address of previous program (old INT 24h)
16h–17h	word	Parent's PSP segment (usually COMMAND.COM - internal)
18h–2Bh	20 bytes	Job File Table (JFT) (internal)
2Ch–2Dh	word	Environment segment
2Eh–31h	dword	SS:SP on entry to last INT 21h call (internal)
32h–33h	word	JFT size (internal)
34h–37h	dword	Pointer to JFT (internal)
38h–3Bh	dword	Pointer to previous PSP (only used by SHARE in DOS 3.3 and later)
3Ch–3Fh	4 bytes	Reserved
40h–41h	word	DOS version to return (DOS 5 and later, alterable via SETVER in DOS 5 and later)
42h–4Fh	14 bytes	Reserved
50h–52h	3 bytes (code)	Unix-like far call entry into DOS (always contains INT 21h + RETF)
53h–54h	2 bytes	Reserved
55h–5Bh	7 bytes	Reserved (can be used to make first FCB into an extended FCB)
5Ch–6Bh	16 bytes	Unopened Standard FCB 1
6Ch–7Fh	20 bytes	Unopened Standard FCB 2 (overwritten if FCB 1 is opened)
80h	1 byte	Number of bytes on command-line
81h–FFh	127 bytes	Command-line tail (terminated by a 0Dh)

The PSP is most often used to get the command line arguments of a DOS program; for example, the command "FOO.EXE /A /F" executes FOO.EXE with the arguments '/A' and '/F'.

If the PSP entry for the command line length is non-zero and the pointer to the environment segment is neither 0000h nor FFFFh, programs should first try to retrieve the command line from the environment variable %CMDLINE% before extracting it from the PSP. This way, it is possible to pass command lines longer than 126 characters to applications.

The segment address of the PSP is passed in the DS register when the program is executed. It can also be determined later by using Int 21h function 51h or Int 21h function 62h. Either function will return the PSP address in register BX.

Alternatively, in .COM programs loaded at offset 100h, one can address the PSP directly just by using the offsets listed above. Offset 000h points to the beginning of the PSP, 0FFh points to the end, etc.

For example, the following code displays the command line arguments:

org   100h      ; .COM - not using ds

; INT 21h subfunction 9 requires '$' to terminate string
xor   bx,bx
mov   bl,[80h]
cmp   bl,7Eh
 ja   exit      ; preventing overflow

mov   byte [bx+81h],'$'

; print the string
mov   ah,9
mov   dx,81h
int   21h

exit:
mov   ax,4C00h  ; subfunction 4C
int   21h

In DOS 1.x, it was necessary for the CS (Code Segment) register to contain the same segment as the PSP at program termination, thus standard programming practice involved saving the DS register (since the DS register is loaded with the PSP segment) along with a zero word to the stack at program start and terminating the program with a RETF instruction, which would pop the saved segment value off the stack and jump to address 0 of the PSP, which contained an INT 20h instruction.

; save
push  ds
xor   ax,ax
push  ax

; move to the default data group (@data)
mov   ax,@data
mov   ds,ax

; print message in mess1 (21h subfunction 9)
mov   dx,mess1
mov   ah,9
int   21h

retf

If the executable was a .COM file, this procedure was unnecessary and the program could be terminated merely with a direct INT 20h instruction or else calling INT 21h function 0. However, the programmer still had to ensure that the CS register contained the segment address of the PSP at program termination. Thus,

jmp   start

mess1 db 'Hello world!$'

start:
mov   dx,mess1
mov   ah,9
int   21h

int   20h

In DOS 2.x and higher, program termination was accomplished instead with INT 21h function 4Ch which did not require the CS register to contain the segment value of the PSP.

== See also ==
- Zero page (CP/M)
- CALL 5 (DOS)
- Stack frame (Unix)
- Process directory (Multics)
- Process identifier (PID)
- this (computer programming)
- Self-reference
