= Annemarie Roeper =

German educator (1918–2012)

- Born: Annemarie Bondy; August 27, 1918; Vienna, Austria-Hungary
- Died: May 11, 2012 (aged 93); Oakland, California
- Occupations: Author, Educator
- Known for: Roeper School (Michigan)
- Spouse: George Roeper (m. 1938-1992 his death)
- Children: 3

Annemarie Roeper (August 27, 1918 – May 11, 2012) was a pioneer in gifted education who founded the Roeper School (Michigan) with her husband George in 1941. The school continues on two campuses: lower elementary grades in Bloomfield Hills and Middle-Upper Elementary in Birmingham, in Michigan.

== Early life ==
Annemarie was born on August 27, 1918, in Vienna, Austria-Hungary, to parents Max and Gertrud Bondy.

Gertrud Bondy was a medical doctor as well as a psychiatrist-in-training with Sigmund Freud. Gertrud and her husband Max founded a series of schools focusing on, “psychoanalytic understanding of human development and a desire to educate children to build and thrive in a pluralistic, democratic society” including a school in the town of Marienau. Annemarie observed the strong independent educational ideals very early in life in the school that her parents were creating. The school was Schule Marienau, which is still operating outside Hamburg.

Though the family consisted of mainstream Lutherans, the Bondy family were of Jewish heritage. After the NSDAP party came to power in Austria, Max Bondy sold the school, struggling with this notion that he was not German because of his heritage. He and Annemarie fled in the spring of 1938 with the help of George Roeper, a student in her parents’ school. They escaped Germany before the German annexation of Austria was complete. They left just ahead of the train out of Germany that carried Anna Freud and her parents. They fled first to Switzerland, joining her mother who had fled a year earlier. Then, in 1939, they went to the United States. Prior to the German annexation of Austria, Annemarie had planned on higher education with Anna Freud.

Annemarie married George Roeper in New York City on April 20, 1939.

== Education ==
Annemarie Roeper never fully finished any higher education past high school. While a medical student at the University of Vienna in 1937, she was the youngest person to ever be accepted to study child psychoanalysis with Sigmund and Anna Freud.

The German annexation of Austria of March 1938 prevented her from being able to truly begin her studies. Roeper was able to flee with her father on the last train across the Austrian border before Germany unified with Austria while Sigmund and Anna Freud fled soon after. Eastern Michigan University awarded an honorary doctorate to Roeper and her husband, George Roeper, in 1978.

== Career ==
Roeper and her husband, George, established Roeper School (Michigan) in 1941 with only nine students. Today the school serves over 630 students, from preschool to 12th grade, still focusing on recognition for every student's needs, and an appreciation for emotional and intellectual commitments.

Roeper is recognized as a pioneer for gifted education. Her insistence that the soul of the gifted child is as important as their cognitive abilities has influenced how many gifted educators and counselors interact with these children.

In 1941 Roeper and her husband were invited to Detroit to direct a nursery school and also established a grade school. Their schooling techniques caught on quickly, and the school grew rapidly. The Roeper School began expanding so much that in 1946 they purchased a campus in Bloomfield Hills, Michigan. In 1961 they expanded by purchasing a second campus in Birmingham, Michigan. George was head of the lower grades school in Bloomfield Hills until 1979; Annemarie headed the high school in Birmingham until 1980, when she retired.

In 1956, the same year that Roeper and her husband George established the first board of advisors for the Roeper School, they also convened a panel of national experts and developed a curriculum for gifted children. In September 1956 the Roeper School became only the second school in America to focus solely on gifted education.

Annemarie Roeper's ideas about young childhood cognition caught the eye of Joan Ganz Cooney, and together they worked and consulted on the development of the Sesame Street television show for children. Roeper was a Sesame Street workshop consultant while working on the show.

Roeper taught courses on gifted education at Oakland University in the Greater Detroit area in Michigan.

She retired from the Roeper School in 1980, although she remained on the board of trustees until 2002. In 1989, Roeper received the President's Award from the National Association for Gifted Children for a lifetime of distinguished service to the field.

Roeper published over 100 articles and book chapters, three scholarly books and four children's books. Her last publication was the book ‘Beyond Old Age: Essays on Living and Dying’.

She also developed the Annemarie Roeper Method of Qualitative Assessment to provide a deeper understanding of a child's personality and abilities. She has been listed in Who's Who, Women of the World, and Who's Who of American Women.

Roeper was active with the Merrill Palmer Institute in the 1950s, which was a group of pediatricians, psychologists, and educators in Detroit that met to discuss children's emotional development. Roeper was the president of the Metropolitan Preschool Association in the late 1950s and early 1960s, served on the Michigan State Advisory Council for Early Childhood Education from 1965 to 1968 and was on the Oakland University Advisory Council from 1966 to 1968.

After retiring from university teaching and leading the Roeper School campuses in 1979 and 1980, the Roepers settled in Oakland, California. Her husband George died there in 1992, at the age of 81.

== Death ==
Roeper died from pneumonia and other health problems on May 11, 2012, in Oakland, California. She was 93 years old.

At the time of her death she was survived by her brother, Heinz Bondy and his wife, Carolyn, of Germantown, Maryland; by three children: Tom Roeper and his wife Laura Holland, of Amherst, Massachusetts, Peter Roeper and his wife Martha Harnly, of Oakland, California, and Karen Roeper and her husband Peter Rosselli, of Muir Beach, California; three grandchildren and three great-grandchildren.

== Books ==
She wrote at least three books:

- Educating Children for Life: The Modern Learning Community (1990)
- Annemarie Roeper." Selected Writings and Speeches (1995)-
- The "I" of the Beholder: A Guided Journey to the Essence of a Child (2007)
- Marienau: A Daughter's Reflections (2012)

== Other References ==
- Kane, Michele (2003). "An Evolving Field: A Conversation with Annemarie Roeper: A View from the Self". Roeper Review. 26 (1): 5–11. doi:10.1080/02783190309554231. S2CID 143163675.
- Roeper, Annemarie (1995). Selected Writings and Speeches. Minneapolis: Free Spirit Publishing. Archived from the original on 2011-07-08.
- A conversation with Annemarie Roeper, archived from the original on 2011-01-16
