= Mark Zbikowski =

Microsoft computer programmer

- Born: March 21, 1956 (age 70); Detroit, Michigan
- Education: Harvard University; Yale University
- Known for: DOS MZ executable Work at Microsoft

Mark "Zibo" Joseph Zbikowski (born March 21, 1956) is a former Microsoft Architect and an early computer hacker. He started working at the company only a few years after its inception, leading efforts in MS-DOS, OS/2, Cairo and Windows NT. In 2006, he was honored for 25 years of service with the company, the third employee to reach this milestone, after Bill Gates and Steve Ballmer. He retired the same year from Microsoft.

He was the designer of the MS-DOS executable file format, and the headers of that file format start with his initials: the ASCII characters 'MZ' (0x4D, 0x5A).

== Early years ==
Zbikowski was born in Detroit, Michigan, in 1956. While attending The Roeper School (then known as Roeper City And Country School) from 1961 to 1974, he developed an interest in mathematics and computers. His 8th-grade performance in the Michigan Mathematics Prize Competition led to an invitation in an NSF-funded summer program at Oakland University where he became friends with Microsoft's Steve Ballmer and Jeff Sachs. He later finished second in the MMPC twice in 1972-73 and 1973-74.

Zbikowski pursued computer science at Harvard (A.B. 1978) and at Yale (S.M. 1979). He was active in both universities' Gilbert and Sullivan performing groups.

== Career ==
=== Microsoft ===
Ballmer recruited Zbikowski, who joined Microsoft in 1981. In March 1982, he replaced Tim Paterson as development lead and manager for Microsoft's MS-DOS 2.0, a position he held through DOS 4.0. His first major contributions were the addition of hierarchical directory structure to DOS 2.0 and installable device drivers which later led to Plug and Play in Windows. From March 1985 until 1991, he was on the architecture team for OS/2, development manager for file systems and device drivers, and technical advisor to Paul Maritz. The breakthrough concept of Installable File System in OS/2 is attributed to him.

=== Microsoft and IBM ===
Following the demise of the Microsoft/IBM joint development agreement, he was an architect, development manager and key contributor to Cairo, working for Jim Allchin and, later, Anthony Short. This led to Cairo's Object File System and content index efforts. In 1996, as Cairo migrated from being a standalone product to a technology source, Zbikowski worked under Lou Perazzoli on the Windows NT kernel, focusing on performance and size, before becoming architect and development manager for NT file systems in 1998.

=== Others ===
In 2001, Zbikowski was a candidate for director of the Harvard Alumni Association.

Zbikowski retired from Microsoft in June 2006.

Due to his interest in education, he became affiliated, in 2007, with the University of Washington as a lecturer in the Computer Science and Engineering department in the College of Engineering.

Zbikowski returned to work at Ivy Softworks and Atlas Informatics (2014-2017) as CTO and then at Valve Corporation (2017-2019), retiring again in December 2019. He presently is Technology Advisor to Polyverse.

Mark Zbikowski is or has been affiliated with the following companies:

- (June 2013) Jelastic as Senior Technical Advisor.
- (August 2010) SimulConsult as CTO.
- (January 2008) Parallels, Inc. as Senior Technical Advisor.
- (December 2007) Skytap as Technical Advisor.
- (2007) InstallFree as Technical Advisor.
- (October 2006) BlueDot / Faves as Technical Advisor and Investor.

== See also ==
- List of people from Detroit
