= Rhode Island Math League =

The Rhode Island Mathematics League (RIML) competition consists of four meets spanning the entire year. It culminates at the state championship held at Bishop Hendricken High School. Top schools from the state championship are invited to the New England Association of Math Leagues (NEAML) championship.

== Format ==
Each meet consists of five rounds and a team round. Each team consists of five students, and each school may have as many as six teams with a maximum of two seniors and four sophomores/juniors and a minimum of one sophomore or freshman(or the team may compete with an empty slot). Three students from each team participate in a round. Therefore, each student participates in three rounds and the team round. The first five rounds consist of three questions each. Beginning in 2007, one of the five rounds is designated as "calculator-free", in 2008, this number was increased to two, and in 2018, calculators were banned from all meets. The first question in each round is worth one point, the second two points, and the third three points. Each student works on the questions independently in the ten minutes allotted. All answers must be presented in simplified and rationalized form unless specified otherwise. After the completion of the first five rounds, there is a team round. All five players from each team collaborate on five questions worth two points each. At a meet, the maximum score for one team is 100 points, and the maximum score for one student is 18 points(3 per round). Thus, with 4 meets, the maximum score for a team is 400, and for a student is 72.

== Rounds ==
Each regular meet has five individual rounds plus a team round. Rounds 2–5 are the same at every meet: Algebra I, Geometry, Algebra II, and Miscellaneous Math. Round 1 changes: Arithmetic, Number Theory, and Matrices at meets 1 and 2, and Statistics and Probability at meets 3 and 4.

The playoff has six individual rounds combining all of these topics: Arithmetic/Number Theory/Matrices, Statistics/Probability, Algebra I, Geometry, Algebra II, and Miscellaneous Math. Since the 2019–20 season, the Miscellaneous Math round may draw on any earlier-round topic plus Trigonometry, Analytical Geometry, and Conics. The playoff then adds a relay round where four of the six team members solve four linked questions, each answer feeding the next, followed by a team round in which four members tackle five questions together. This increases the total possible points from 100 to 164(24 for 6 individual rounds, 10 for relay, 10 for team).

== State Champions ==
The table below lists winners of the RIML year-end playoff, which serves as the state championship. In some years the regular-season points title and the playoff title were won by different schools.

RIML playoff (state championship) winners
Year	Champion	Notes
2018	Barrington	Won both the regular season and the playoff (145 points).
2019	Wheeler	Won both the regular season and the playoff.
2020	Not held	Playoff cancelled due to the COVID-19 pandemic; Wheeler led the regular season with 340 points.
2021	Barrington	COVID-affected season.
2022	Barrington	Wheeler won the regular-season title; Barrington won the playoff.
2023	Barrington	Barrington and Wheeler tied for the regular-season title; Barrington won the playoff, 155–131.
2024	Wheeler	Defeated Barrington by one point.
2025	Barrington	Defeated Wheeler, 138–128.
2026	Barrington	Won with 149 points, 10 ahead of runner-up Wheeler; held at Cumberland High School.

== Practice Problems ==
A link to previous competition problems can be found here.
