= Dr Solomon's Antivirus =

Antivirus software

Dr Solomon's
- Original author: Alan Solomon
- Developers: S&S International
- Release: 1988; 38 years ago
- Operating system: Microsoft Windows
- Type: Anti-malware

Dr Solomon's Anti-Virus Toolkit (often marketed simply as Dr Solomon's) was an antivirus software suite developed by the British company S&S International for MS-DOS, early versions of Microsoft Windows, Novell NetWare, SCO Unix, Sun Solaris and OS/2. It was created by computer scientist Alan Solomon in the late 1980s in response to the growing problem of personal computer viruses.

== History ==
Solomon began developing what became Dr Solomon's Anti-Virus Toolkit in 1988 while running S&S International, initially as part of his work on data recovery and virus analysis. The product was launched commercially in 1991 as a suite of tools for detecting, removing and preventing PC viruses and competed with other contemporary antivirus products such as Symantec's Norton AntiVirus and McAfee VirusScan.

Dr Solomon's Antivirus received favourable reviews and recommendations in technology publications during the early 1990s, including coverage in Byte and InfoWorld, which highlighted its detection rates. In 1993 the product received the Queen's Award for Technological Achievement, by which time S&S International had begun trading its antivirus products under the "Dr Solomon's" brand.

In June 1998 Network Associates Inc. (which later reverted to the McAfee name) announced a deal to acquire Dr Solomon's Group plc for more than US$640 million in stock, describing the purchase as a way to strengthen its position in the European antivirus market.

== Features ==
Dr Solomon's Anti-Virus Toolkit was distributed as a collection of utilities rather than a single monolithic program. DOS and Windows versions typically included an on-demand scanner, a memory-resident component for real-time monitoring, and boot-disk tools intended to clean infected systems. The software focused on detecting file and boot sector viruses and later added capabilities for macro viruses as those threats emerged.

By the mid-1990s versions of the toolkit were available for several network and multi-user operating systems, including Novell NetWare, SCO Unix, Solaris and OS/2, allowing administrators to scan both servers and client PCs for known malware.

== Reception ==
Dr Solomon's Anti-Virus Toolkit was frequently covered in computer magazines during the early 1990s. Columnist Jerry Pournelle recommended the product in his Byte magazine column in 1992 and later described it as one of the more effective antivirus services he had used.

In comparative testing published in InfoWorld in 1997, Dr Solomon's was reported as achieving high detection rates relative to competing products.

Alan Solomon went on to become a prominent figure in the antivirus field, contributing to industry organizations such as the Computer Antivirus Research Organization (CARO) and the European Institute for Computer Antivirus Research (EICAR). In later years he was frequently cited in discussions about the evolution of antivirus technology and the limits of traditional signature-based detection.

Obituaries and retrospectives published following Solomon's death in 2024 described Dr Solomon's Anti-Virus Toolkit as one of the early commercial antivirus products that helped establish the personal-computer security market in the late 1980s and early 1990s.
