= DOS/32 =

32-bit extender for DOS

- Developer: Narech Koumar
- Final release: 9.1.2 / April 20, 2006; 19 years ago
- Repository: github.com/amindlost/dos32a
- Operating system: DOS
- Platform: x86
- Type: DOS extender
- License: Adapted Apache Software License 1.1 without non-endorsement clause
- Website: web.archive.org/web/20220628021610/https://dos32a.narechk.net

DOS/32 is a 32-bit DOS extender created for replacing DOS/4GW extender and compatibles. This extender can be used in various environments, from embedded systems to DOS emulators, by both developers and end users alike. Unlike DOS/4GW, DOS/32 is free, open-source and can be extended to create a unique executable file that incorporates the extender memory tool and main application code.

== Compatibility ==
DOS/32 is compatible with MS-DOS 5.00 through 7.10, Windows 3.x, 95, 98 and Me, NT 3.51 and 4.0 (Service Pack 3 or later), 2000, XP and IBM OS/2 as well as OpenDOS and DOSEMU.

DOS/32 has been tested and proved to be fully compatible with software which use DOS/4G, DOS/4GW, DOS/4GW Professional, PMODE/W and CauseWay DOS Extenders.

== Features ==
The DOS Extender includes a built-in Advanced DOS Protected Mode Interface server supporting v0.9 of the DPMI specification and comes with a set of tools needed to create 32-bit protected mode applications. Like DOS/4G, it requires IBM PC compatible 80386 processor or better.

== History ==
DOS/32 has been commercially available since 1996. As of May 2002, it was released to the public in the form of "Liberty Edition" along with its complete source code under terms similar to the Apache License of the time, (Note: i.e. version 1.1) allowing unrestricted, royalty-free distribution with certain provisions regarding reference to it in documentation and the naming of derived software.

== See also ==
- DOS/4G
- DOS Protected Mode Interface (DPMI)
