= Michigan Mathematics Prize Competition =

Math competition held in Michigan

The Michigan Mathematics Prize Competition (MMPC) is an annual high school mathematics competition held in Michigan. First founded in 1958, the competition has grown to include over 10,000 high school participants (although middle-schoolers may also participate through a high school). The director and host of this competition changes every three years, the most recent director being Stephanie Edwards of Hope College. This competition consists of two parts, which are added together to determine score:

Part I: A 40 question, multiple-choice exam open to all Michigan high schoolers

Part II: A 5 question, proof exam given only to the Top 1000 scorers on Part I

The Top 100 scorers on the combined score of both parts of the competition are honored at an awards banquet, usually at the host university, although recent years have seen more than 100 people being awarded due to ties.

== Problem difficulty ==
The problems on the competition range from basic algebra to precalculus and are within the grasp of a high schooler's mathematical knowledge. The contest contains concepts from a variety of topics, including geometry and combinatorics.

== Grading ==
Part I has 40 multiple-choice questions with five choices each. One point is awarded for each correct answer, giving a maximum score of forty points.

Part II has five ten point proof-based problems. The test is graded out of fifty points. This part is weighted x1.2, so the total number of points possible is 60.

The highest possible score on this test is 100 points (summing the Part I and Part II scores).

It is common for the winner of the competition to score anywhere from 90 to 95 points due to the difficulty of the exam. It sometimes falls even lower due to especially tough exams.

Through 2018, the only perfect scores were achieved in 2015, by Ankan Bhattacharya of International Academy East, and in 2016, by Chittesh Thavamani and Freddie Zhao, both of Troy High School. 2016 also marked the year of the highest scoring 3rd, 4th, and 5th-place winners in MMPC history with 3rd place scoring 99 points, 4th place scoring 98.8 points, and 5th place scoring 97.6 points. This changed in 2019, which saw all three winners, Maxim Li of Okemos High School, Steven Raphael of The Roeper School, and Alex Xu of Troy High School, receive a perfect score.

== Awards ==
The Top 100 are invited to an awards banquet. Although the Top 50 are denoted as "bronze," no actual medal is awarded. Likewise, the Top 10 and Top 3 are called "silver" and "gold" (respectively) but do not receive medals.

The Lower 50 are deemed "honorable mentions" and receive a gift card/certificate/book.

Everyone in the Top 50 receives a scholarship ranging in size from $250 to $2500

In the 2012 contest, Akhil Nistala became the first winner in Novi High School history, breaking a streak of 6 consecutive top scorers for Detroit Country Day School.

== Recent winners ==
- 1993: Amit Khetan, ICAE
- 1994: Amit Khetan, ICAE
- 1995: Amit Khetan, ICAE
- 1996: Bryant Matthews, Forest Hills Northern High School
- 1997: J. Benjamen Hough, H.H. Dow High School
- 1998: Michael Khoury Jr., Brother Rice High School
- 1999: Qian Zhang, Livonia MSC Program
- 2000: Qian Zhang, Livonia MSC Program
- 2001: Mike Asmar, Troy High School
- 2002: Robert Hough, Dow High School
- 2003: Anant Gupta, Troy High School
- 2004: John Zhou, Detroit Country Day School
- 2005: Frederic Sala, Troy High School
- 2006: Alan Huang, Detroit Country Day School
- 2007: Alan Huang, Detroit Country Day School
- 2008: Allen Yuan, Detroit Country Day School
- 2009: Allen Yuan, Detroit Country Day School
- 2010: Allen Yuan, Detroit Country Day School
- 2011: David Lu, Detroit Country Day School
- 2012: Akhil Nistala, Novi High School
- 2013: Jacqueline Bredenberg, Detroit Country Day School
- 2014: Jacqueline Bredenberg, Detroit Country Day School
- 2015: Ankan Bhattacharya, International Academy East
- 2016: Chittesh Thavamani, Troy High School and Freddie Zhao, Troy High School
- 2017: Grace Zheng, Ann Arbor Skyline High School
- 2018: Alex Xu, Troy High School
- 2019: Maxim Li, Okemos High School, Steven Raphael, The Roeper School and Alex Xu, Troy High School
