= Equity Schools =

- Company type: Benefit corporation
- Founded: 2001
- Founder: Richard R. Murray
- Headquarters: Chicago
- Services: solving capital and operational funding problems

Equity Schools is a Chicago-based benefit corporation focused on solving capital and operational funding problems for schools, businesses, and other organizations. They primarily work with public, private, charter, and independent schools, and are known for using various non-conventional funding methods, or nonlinear project funding.

The firm was founded in 2001 by its current president Richard R. Murray, who is most known for his invention of the corporate work study program used by the Cristo Rey Network.

== History ==
Murray's creation and first use of the nonlinear project funding model was in 1996 when he was approached by Cristo Rey High School in Chicago to help them find a way to fund their new school. The group had few assets and no plan of how they would create a quality program that would be affordable to inner city students.

The program Murray designed is based upon the concepts of job sharing and employee leasing; Cristo Rey students attend class four days per week, and then attend a corporate internship at a Chicago business on the fifth day. The revenues generated by these internships cover a great majority of tuition costs for Cristo Rey students, which helps keep their tuition rates low.

After implementation of this plan the Chicago community school saw its dropout rate decline from 75% to 1%, with 100% of graduates being accepted to college. The Cristo Rey Network now successfully operates this program at 38 schools across 24 states.

Murray's experience creating the nonlinear method when working with Cristo Rey led him to found Equity Schools in 2001. Since its creation, Equity Schools has worked with many schools in the US to plan and implement solutions to funding problems.

== Nonlinear project funding ==
The nonlinear approach used by Equity Schools is a method at working through funding problems when conventional sources of funding are not enough to accomplish a project or maintain operations. Conventional, or “linear”, sources of funding often rely upon fundraising and government programs (loans, grants, tax referendums). By contrast, a nonlinear approach may use conventional funding sources where applicable, but then examines relationships and existing revenue streams to identify sufficient funding from several, often non-obvious or unexpected sources.

Utilizing multiple diverse sources for funding makes a nonlinear approach highly conducive to a customized, self-sustaining funding strategy to support projects and operations. This approach is comprehensive as it includes factors such as a school's curriculum, character and culture, finances, real estate, and long-term educational, operational, and capital needs.

In a 2021 interview, Murray described the nonlinear way of thinking and process, including "The 17 Rules of Nonlinear Funding".
