= Zero page (CP/M) =

The Zero Page (or Base Page) is a data structure used in CP/M systems for programs to communicate with the operating system. In 8-bit CP/M versions it is located in the first 256 bytes of memory, hence its name.

In 8-bit CP/M, it has the following structure:

Offset	Size	Contents
00–02	Code	Exit program (jumps to the BIOS, and is also used to find BIOS entry points).
03	Byte	I/O byte, an optional feature allowing device reassignment in CP/M 2.
04	Byte	Current command processor drive (low 4 bits) and user number (high 4 bits).
05–07	Code	Jump to CP/M BDOS entry - main system call entry point. This is also the address of the first byte of memory not usable by the program.
08–3A	Code	8080 restart/interrupt vectors.
3B–3F	Bytes	Reserved
40–4F	Bytes	Reserved for use by the BIOS
50	Byte	The drive from which the program was loaded (CP/M 3)
51–52	Word	Address of the password for the first FCB (CP/M 3)
53	Byte	Length of the password for the first FCB (CP/M 3)
54–55	Word	Address of the password for the second FCB (CP/M 3)
56	Byte	Length of the password for the second FCB (CP/M 3)
57–5B	Bytes	Reserved
5C–6B		Default FCB 1
6C–7F		Default FCB 2 (overwritten if FCB 1 is opened)
80	Byte	Number of characters in command tail.
81–FF	Bytes	Command tail (everything after the program name).

In CP/M-86, the structure is:

Offset	Size	Contents
00–02	Bytes	Length of code group in bytes
03–04	Word	Segment address of code group
05	Byte	8080 model flag - set if program only has one segment
06–08	Bytes	Length of data group in bytes
09–0A	Word	Segment address of data group
0B	Byte	Reserved
0C–11		Descriptor for extra group - same format as for data
12–17		Descriptor for stack group
18–1D		Descriptor for X1 group
1E–23		Descriptor for X2 group
24–29		Descriptor for X3 group
2A–2F		Descriptor for X4 group
30–4F	Bytes	Reserved
50	Byte	The drive from which the program was loaded (CP/M 3)
51–52	Word	Address of the password for the first FCB (CP/M 3)
53	Byte	Length of the password for the first FCB (CP/M 3)
54–55	Word	Address of the password for the second FCB (CP/M 3)
56	Byte	Length of the password for the second FCB (CP/M 3)
57–5B	Bytes	Reserved
5C–6B		Default FCB 1
6C–7F		Default FCB 2 (overwritten if FCB 1 is opened)
80	Byte	Number of characters in command tail.
81–FF	Bytes	Command tail (everything after the program name).

== See also ==
- Zero page (processor property)
- Page boundary relocation
