= Industry Connections Security Group =

The Industry Connections Security Group (IEEE ICSG) is a global group of computer security entities (past and present members include: Anh Labs, AVG, Avira, ESET, F-Secure, K7 Computing, Kaspersky Labs, Marvell, McAfee, Microsoft, Palo Alto Networks, Panda Software, SafeNet, Sophos, Symantec and Trend Micro) that have come together under IEEE to pool their experience and resources in combating the systematic and rapid rise in computer security threats.

IEEE ICSG activities include:

- Anti-malware working group
- Malware meta-data exchange standard (MMDEF) working group
- Privilege Management Protocols working group
- Anti-malware support service which includes
  - The taggant system
  - Clean meta-data exchange system (CMX)
