= VxD =

Device driver model used in Microsoft Windows/386

VxD is the device driver model used in Microsoft Windows/386 2.x, the 386 enhanced mode of Windows 3.x, Windows 9x, and to some extent also by the Novell DOS 7, OpenDOS 7.01, and DR-DOS 7.02 (and higher) multitasker (TASKMGR). VxDs have access to the memory of the kernel and all running processes, as well as raw access to the hardware. Starting with Windows 98, Windows Driver Model was the recommended driver model to write drivers for, with the VxD driver model still being supported for backward compatibility, until Windows Me.

== Name and design ==
The name "VxD" is an abbreviation for "virtual xxx driver", where "xxx" is some class of hardware device. It derives from the fact that most drivers had filenames of the form vxxxd.386 in Windows 3.x. Some examples are vjoyd.386 (joystick) and vmm.386 (memory manager). VxDs under Windows 3.x usually have the filename extension .386, while those under Windows 9x have .vxd. Windows 9x VxDs are in Linear Executable format; its code can be 16-bit and 32-bit hybrid, or pure 32-bit. VxDs written for Windows 3.x can be used under Windows 9x but not vice versa.

== History ==
Prior to the advent of Windows, DOS applications would either communicate directly with the various pieces of hardware (responding to interrupts, reading and writing device memory etc.) or go through a DOS device driver. As DOS was not multitasking, each application would have exclusive and complete control over the hardware while running. Though Windows applications don't often communicate directly with hardware, it was the only way for Windows drivers; and still is in the real and standard modes of Windows 3.x.

Windows/386 and onward allowed multiple DOS applications to execute concurrently by executing each within its own virtual machine. To share physical resources among these virtual machines, Microsoft introduced virtual device drivers. These drivers solved issues relating to conflicting usage of physical resources by intercepting calls to the hardware. Instead of a machine port representing an actual device, it would represent a "virtual" device, which could be managed by the operating system.

== Obsolescence ==
Although Windows 98 introduced the Windows Driver Model (WDM), VxD device drivers can be used under Windows 98 and Windows Me. Using VxD drivers instead of WDM drivers in Windows 9x may result in advanced ACPI states like hibernation being unavailable.

VxDs are not usable in Windows NT or its descendants. Windows NT-based operating systems from 3.1 to 4.0 must use drivers written specifically for them. These drivers are otherwise known as the Windows NT Driver Model. Starting with Windows 2000, Windows NT-based operating systems have adopted the Windows Driver Model from Windows 98.

VxDs should not be confused with the similarly named NTVDM-specific 'VDDs' (Virtual Device Drivers), which provide a method of emulating direct I/O under a Windows NT "DOS Box". NTVDM VDDs run as regular, 32-bit, user-mode DLLs, and must rely on the Win32 API (or another WDM driver) to emulate the desired I/O on behalf of the 16-bit program.

== See also ==
- VXD (CONFIG.SYS directive)
- Windows Driver Model (WDM)
- Architecture of Windows 9x
