= List of geographic centers of the United States =

This is a list of geographic centers of each U.S. state and inhabited territory. The geographic center of the United States is northeast of Belle Fourche in Butte County, South Dakota (44°58′N 103°46′W), while that of the contiguous 48 states is near Lebanon in Smith County, Kansas (39°50′N 98°35′W). The geographic center of North America lies near Rugby, North Dakota (48°10′N 100°10′W), though this designation has no official status. In 2017, a new calculation of the geographic center of North America placed it near the town of Center, North Dakota.

== Historic list of geographic centers ==
The list given below has been only slightly modified since it was first produced by the U.S. Geological Survey (USGS) in the early 1920s. At that time, the center for a state was found by suspending a cardboard cutout of the state by a string, and then drawing a vertical line from the suspension point. After rotating the cutout 90 degrees and drawing another vertical line from the new suspension point, the intersection of the two vertical lines was used as the geographic center. The result is dependent upon the type of projection used.

Geographic centers of the states of the United States and the District of Columbia
State or federal district	County	Location	Coordinates
Alabama	Chilton County	Clanton	32°50′5″N 86°38′0″W
Alaska	Yukon–Koyukuk Census Area	Tanana	64°43′54″N 152°28′12″W
Arizona	Yavapai County	Camp Verde	34°34′00″N 111°51′22″W
Arkansas	Saline County	Bryant	34.6358°N 92.4783°W
California	Madera County	North Fork	37°9′58″N 119°26′58″W
Colorado	Park County	40 mi (64 km) west of Colorado Springs, southwest of Castle Rock	39°00′00″N 105°32′42.6″W
Connecticut	Hartford County	Berlin	
Delaware	Kent County	11 mi (18 km) southwest of Dover	38°58′48″N 75°30′42″W
District of Columbia	District of Columbia (Note: The U.S. Census Bureau treats the District of Columbia as a state-equivalent and a county-equivalent for statistical purposes.)	Near 4th and L Streets, Northwest	38°54′15″N 77°00′58″W
Florida	Hernando County	12 mi (19 km) north-northwest of Brooksville	28°40′53″N 82°27′36″W
(Georgia (U.S. state)) Georgia	Twiggs County	18 mi (29 km) southeast of Macon	32°39′43.6″N 83°26′17.9″W
Hawaii	Maui County	off-shore southwest of Molokai and west of Lanai	
Idaho	Custer County	on the Yankee Fork River, southwest of Challis	44°16′11″N 114°44′04″W
Illinois	Sangamon County	1.5 mi (2.4 km) southeast of Rochester	39°44′21.5″N 89°30′13.1″W
Indiana	Hendricks County	2 mi (3.2 km) west of Avon	39°45′57.7″N 86°26′28.6″W
Iowa	Story County	5 mi (8.0 km) northeast of Ames	
Kansas	Barton County	Northeast of Great Bend	98° 41' 54" W, 38° 29' 54" N
Kentucky	Marion County	3 mi (4.8 km) north-northwest of Lebanon	
Louisiana	Avoyelles Parish	3 mi (4.8 km) southeast of Marksville	
Maine	Piscataquis County	18 mi (29 km) north of Dover-Foxcroft	45°15′11.9982″N 69°13′59.9988″W
Maryland	Prince George's County	4.5 mi (7.2 km) northwest of Davidsonville	38°58′18.03″N 76°40′6.0024″W
Massachusetts	Worcester County	12 mi (19 km) northwest of Worcester, in Rutland	42°22′37.62″N 71°55′30.93″W
Michigan	Wexford County	5 mi (8.0 km) north-northwest of Cadillac	
Minnesota	Crow Wing County	10 mi (16 km) southwest of Brainerd	
Mississippi	Leake County	9 mi (14 km) west-northwest of Carthage	
Missouri	Miller County	20 mi (32 km) southwest of Jefferson City	38°30′59.31″N 92°23′52.71″W
Montana	Fergus County	11 mi (18 km) west of Lewistown	47°03′52″N 109°40′01″W
Nebraska	Custer County	10 mi (16 km) northwest of Broken Bow	41°31′30″N 99°51′42″W
Nevada	Lander County	26 mi (42 km) southeast of Austin	
New Hampshire	Belknap County	3 mi (4.8 km) east of Ashland	43°41′6″N 71°34′38″W
New Jersey	Burlington County	5 mi (8.0 km) southeast of Trenton	40°4′12″N 74°33′30″W
New Mexico	Torrance County	12 mi (19 km) south-southwest of Willard	34°26′17″N 106°06′44″W
(New York (state)) New York	Madison County	26 mi (42 km) southwest of Utica, near Syracuse	42°57′9″N 76°1′0″W
North Carolina	Chatham County	10 mi (16 km) northwest of Sanford	
North Dakota	Sheridan County	5 mi (8.0 km) southwest of McClusky	
Ohio	Knox County	north-northeast of Columbus, 5.6 mi (9.0 km) southwest of Centerburg	
Oklahoma	Oklahoma County	8 mi (13 km) north of Oklahoma City	
Oregon	Crook County	25 mi (40 km) south-southeast of Prineville	
Pennsylvania	Centre County	2.5 mi (4.0 km) southwest of Bellefonte, in State College	
Rhode Island	Kent County	1-mile (1.6 km) south-southwest of Crompton	41°40′18″N 71°34′36″W
South Carolina	Richland County	13 mi (21 km) southeast of Columbia	33°50′13″N 80°55′30″W
South Dakota	Hughes County	8 mi (13 km) northeast of Pierre	
Tennessee	Rutherford County	5 mi (8.0 km) northeast of Murfreesboro	
Texas	McCulloch County	15 mi (24 km) northeast of Brady	31°23′29.52″N 99°10′14.34″W
Utah	Sanpete County	3 mi (4.8 km) north of Manti	39°18′29″N 111°38′20″W
Vermont	Washington County	3 mi (4.8 km) east of Roxbury	
Virginia	Buckingham County	5 mi (8.0 km) southwest of Buckingham	
(Washington (state)) Washington	Chelan County	10 mi (16 km) west-southwest of Wenatchee	
West Virginia	Braxton County	4 mi (6.4 km) east of Sutton	
Wisconsin	Wood County	9 mi (14 km) southeast of Marshfield	44°26′16.00″N 90°07′48.67″W
Wyoming	Fremont County	58 mi (93 km) east-northeast of Lander	43°00′00″N 107°32′42.6″W

== Modern list of geographic centers ==
Although there have been different definitions offered for the geographic center, an intuitive one, and one used by the USGS, is "the center of gravity of the surface, or that point on which the surface of the area would balance if it were a plane of uniform thickness." An updated list of geographic centers using this definition (which is equivalent to the state's centroid) is given below. It was derived by minimizing the sum of squared great circle distances from all points of land in a state (including islands, but not coastal waters, following the earlier practice of the USGS). It represents a slight improvement over the list originally published.

The geographic center of the contiguous United States, determined in this way, is at 39°50.13′N 99°5.45′W; this is 5.4 miles (8.7 km) from Agra, Kansas, 5.7 miles (9.2 km) from Kensington, Kansas, and 26.9 great circle miles (43.3 km) west of the longstanding designated site near Lebanon, Kansas.

Updated geographic centers of the states of the United States and the District of Columbia
State or federal district	Location	Coordinates
Alabama	2.73 mi (4.39 km) east of Maplesville	32°46′46″N 86°49′43″W
Alaska	77.9 mi (125.4 km) northwest of Denali	64°04′07″N 152°16′42″W
Arizona	49.7 mi (80.0 km) east-southeast of Prescott	34°16′28″N 111°39′37″W
Arkansas	14.2 mi (22.9 km) northwest of Little Rock	34°53′38″N 92°26′33″W
California	36 mi (58 km) northeast of Madera	37°11′03″N 119°28′11″W
Colorado	29.2 mi (47.0 km) northwest of Pikes Peak	38°59′50″N 105°32′52″W
Connecticut	1.1 mi (1.8 km) east of East Berlin	41°37′19″N 72°43′38″W
Delaware	11.7 mi (18.8 km) south of Dover	38°59′23″N 75°30′18″W
District of Columbia	Near 3rd and P Streets, Northwest	38°54′36″N 77°00′53″W
Florida	5.8 mi (9.3 km) northwest of Brooksville	28°37′50″N 82°26′59″W
(Georgia (U.S. state)) Georgia	17.7 mi (28.5 km) southeast of Macon	32°38′29″N 83°26′33″W
Hawaii	27.7 mi (44.6 km) off-shore south of Wailea-Makena	20°17′34″N 156°22′25″W
Idaho	21.4 mi (34.4 km) west-southwest of Challis	44°21′03″N 114°36′47″W
Illinois	28.8 mi (46.3 km) northeast of Springfield	40°02′30″N 89°11′47″W
Indiana	10.8 mi (17.4 km) northwest of Indianapolis	39°53′39″N 86°16′54″W
Iowa	7 mi (11 km) northeast of Ames	42°04′30″N 93°29′46″W
Kansas	1.5 mi (2.4 km) southeast of Bushton	38°29′38″N 98°22′38″W
Kentucky	3.4 mi (5.5 km) southwest of Lebanon	37°32′05″N 85°18′08″W
Louisiana	5.8 mi (9.3 km) southeast of Marksville	31°04′08″N 91°59′48″W
Maine	12.6 mi (20.3 km) north of Dover-Foxcroft	45°22′10″N 69°14′34″W
Maryland	3.3 mi (5.3 km) north of Bowie	39°03′18″N 76°47′27″W
Massachusetts	Irving St. and Wellington St., Worcester	42°15′35″N 71°48′30″W
Michigan	6.6 mi (10.6 km) west of Cadillac	44°20′48″N 85°24′37″W
Minnesota	10 mi (16 km) southwest of Brainerd	46°16′51″N 94°18′19″W
Mississippi	7.7 mi (12.4 km) west-northwest of Carthage	32°44′11″N 89°40′04″W
Missouri	21 mi (34 km) southwest of Jefferson City	38°21′24″N 92°27′29″W
Montana	10.1 mi (16.3 km) west of Lewistown	47°03′10″N 109°38′00″W
Nebraska	12.3 mi (19.8 km) northwest of Broken Bow	41°32′16″N 99°47′42″W
Nevada	26 mi (42 km) southeast of Austin	39°19′44″N 116°37′52″W
New Hampshire	2.6 mi (4.2 km) east of Ashland	43°40′50″N 71°34′52″W
New Jersey	4.3 mi (6.9 km) southeast of Trenton	40°11′27″N 74°40′22″W
New Mexico	13.8 mi (22.2 km) south-southwest of Willard	34°24′26″N 106°06′45″W
(New York (state)) New York	11.5 mi (18.5 km) south-southeast of Oneida	42°57′14″N 75°31′36″W
North Carolina	12.7 mi (20.4 km) northwest of Sanford	35°33′21″N 79°23′16″W
North Dakota	2.7 mi (4.3 km) southwest of McClusky	47°27′00″N 100°27′57″W
Ohio	24.9 mi (40.1 km) north-northeast of Columbus	40°17′10″N 82°47′37″W
Oklahoma	4.4 mi (7.1 km) south of Edmond	35°35′20″N 97°29′39″W
Oregon	29.1 mi (46.8 km) southeast of Prineville	43°56′01″N 120°33′30″W
Pennsylvania	2.7 mi (4.3 km) southwest of Bellefonte, in State College	40°52′41″N 77°47′59″W
Rhode Island	2.4-mile (3.9 km) west of Crompton, in West Warwick	41°40′34″N 71°33′22″W
South Carolina	9.7 mi (15.6 km) southeast of Columbia	33°55′01″N 80°53′47″W
South Dakota	7.9 mi (12.7 km) northeast of Pierre	44°26′39″N 100°13′35″W
Tennessee	2.5 mi (4.0 km) northeast of Murfreesboro	35°51′29″N 86°21′02″W
Texas	23.6 mi (38.0 km) north of Brady	31°28′33″N 99°19′52″W
Utah	3.1 mi (5.0 km) northwest of Manti	39°18′20″N 111°40′13″W
Vermont	3.7 mi (6.0 km) southeast of Roxbury	44°04′07″N 72°39′57″W
Virginia	16.6 mi (26.7 km) west of Buckingham	37°31′17″N 78°51′13″W
(Washington (state)) Washington	7 mi (11 km) west-southwest of Wenatchee	47°22′57″N 120°26′50″W
West Virginia	4.9 mi (7.9 km) east-southeast of Sutton	38°38′27″N 80°37′22″W
Wisconsin	9.3 mi (15.0 km) east-southeast of Marshfield	44°37′27″N 89°59′39″W
Wyoming	60.6 mi (97.5 km) east-northeast of Lander	42°59′45″N 107°33′04″W

== Geographic centers of the U.S. territories ==
Very little information exists about the geographic centers of the U.S. territories. In a geological survey of all geographic centers in the U.S., the U.S. Department of the Interior did not measure the geographic centers of the U.S. territories. Similarly, the USGS does not include the territories in its list of geographic centers. In terms of each territory’s land area, only one territory, Puerto Rico, has a confirmed geographic center. There are also official geographic centers of territorial exclusive economic zones, though those geographic centers are based on a territory's territorial waters (not land area).

Geographic centers of the U.S. territories
Territory	County- equivalent	Location	Coordinates
American Samoa	North of Manu’a District (EEZ); Eastern District (Tutuila center)	The geographic center of American Samoa’s exclusive economic zone (EEZ) is located in the Pacific Ocean, about 35.08 miles (56.45 km) northeast of the island of Ta‘ū. The geographic center of Tutuila (the main island) is about 1.03 miles (1.65 km) southwest of Fagatogo.	13.8517°S 169.0576°W (EEZ center); 14.2901°S 170.7028°W (Tutuila center)
Guam	Guam (Note: All of Guam is counted as one county-equivalent by the U.S. Census Bureau.)	The geographic center of Guam’s exclusive economic zone is in the Pacific Ocean, about 73.65 miles (118.53 km) west-southwest of Cocos Island and 76.08 miles (122.45 km) west-southwest of the main island of Guam. The exact geographic center of the main island of Guam is unknown — it is probably somewhere within the village of Chalan Pago-Ordot, because that is the default center starting point of Guam on Google Maps.	12.9770°N 143.5814°E (Center of EEZ); 13.4440°N 144.7671°E (Chalan Pago-Ordot)
Northern Mariana Islands	Northern Islands Municipality	The geographic center of the Northern Mariana Islands’ exclusive economic zone is in the Pacific Ocean, about 18.33 miles (29.50 km) northeast of the island of Pagan.	18.3183°N 146.0284°E (EEZ center)
Puerto Rico	Orocovis Municipality	The geographic center of Puerto Rico is in the Orocovis Municipality, about 2.58 miles (4.15 km) west of the main town of Orocovis.	18.2223°N 66.4303°W
U.S. Virgin Islands	Between Saint Thomas and Saint Croix	The exact geographic center of the U.S. Virgin Islands is unknown — the default center starting point for the U.S. Virgin Islands on Google Maps is located in the Caribbean Sea, 18.21 miles (29.30 km) south-southeast of Saint Thomas and 18.31 miles (29.47 km) north of Saint Croix — note that this point is the approximate center of the 3 main islands, not the center of the exclusive economic zone	18.34°N 64.90°W
(United States) U.S. Minor Outlying Islands	(Note: Each of the 9 island groups in the U.S. Minor Outlying Islands is counted as a county-equivalent by the U.S. Census Bureau.)	There is no information about the geographic centers of the islands in the U.S. Minor Outlying Islands (or the U.S. Minor Outlying Islands as a whole).	

== See also ==
- Geographic center of the contiguous United States
- Geographic center of the United States
- List of extreme points of the United States
- List of extreme points of U.S. states and territories
- List of U.S. states and territories by elevation
- Mean center of the United States population
- Median center of United States population

== Works cited ==
- "Geographic Center of the United States" (PDF). ngs.noaa.gov. National Oceanic and Atmospheric Administration.
- "States and Capitals". 50states.com. Digital Properties. 2021.
