= Analytical procedures =

Analytical procedures are the procedures employed in various types of analysis and analytics, including:

- Analytical procedures (finance), procedures for audits
- Procedures used in chemical analysis
  - Deformulation, a set of analytical procedures used to separate and identify individual components of a formulated chemical substance
  - Procedures in analytical quality control, a type of verification and validation, designed to ensure that the results of laboratory analysis are consistent, comparable, accurate, and within specified limits of precision
- Analytical procedures in magnetostratigraphy, a geophysical technique used for rock dating
- Analytical procedures used in statistical geography
- Procedures used in environmental systems analysis, describing human impacts on the environment to support decisions and actions aimed at perceived current or future environmental problems
- Analytical procedures in video data analysis, a collection of tools, techniques, and quality criteria intended for analyzing the content of visuals to study driving dynamics of social behavior and events in real-life settings
