= Center of the United States =

Center of the United States may refer to:

- Geographic center of the United States
- Mean center of the United States population
- Median center of United States population
