= Humanitarian design =

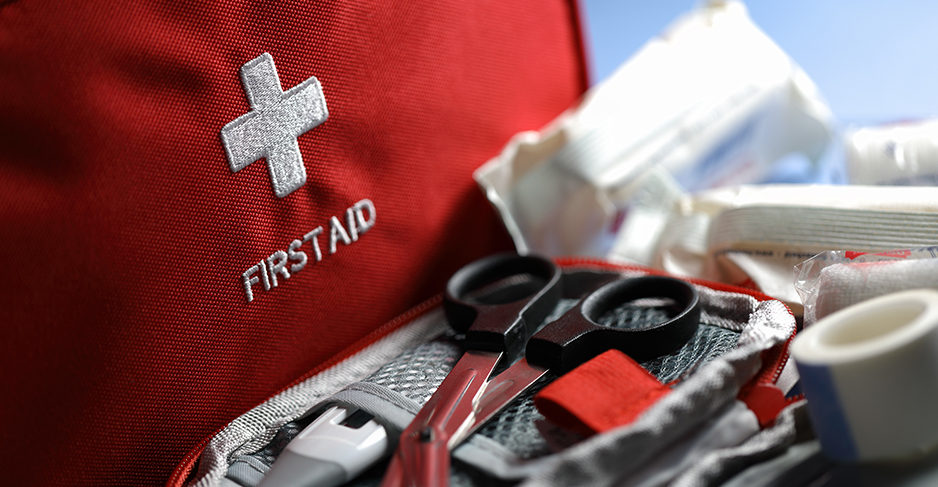
A first aid kit, one of the first known humanitarian design documented in history.

Humanitarian design is the use of design in humanitarian aid task forces. It is important for peacemaking, education in emergency (EiE), environmental disaster , public housing, and refugee camps emergency management since it establishes survivalist best practices.

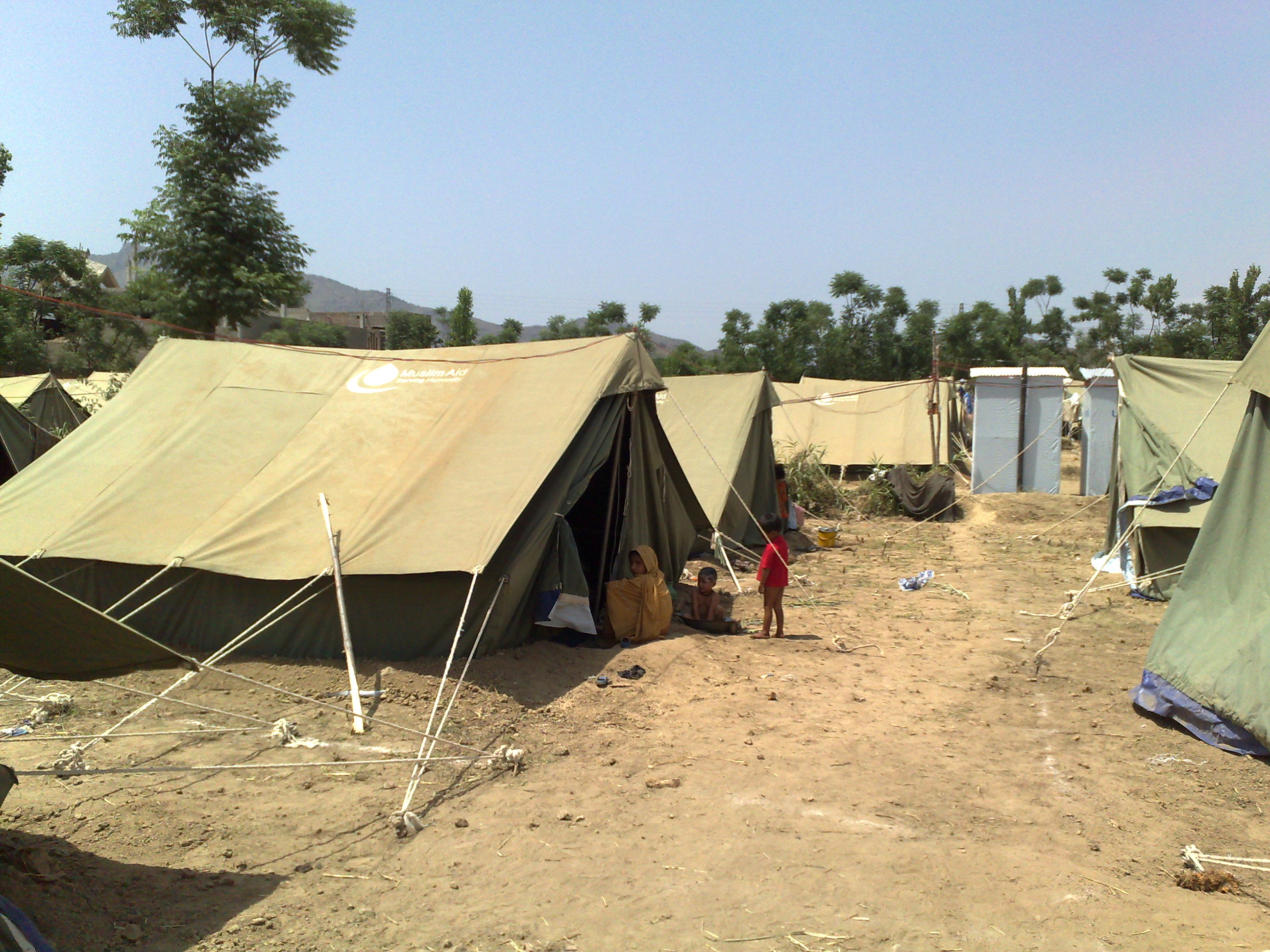
A refugee camp with designed tents.

In 2025 the field even was lauded with the American Prize for Architecture through Shigeru Ban.

== Critique ==
Although many humanitarian designers promote AI assisted solutions, thinkers have criticized the fact that humanitarian design follows too much momentary fashions of emerging technologies so leaving assisted people's needs aside.
