= Eilam =

Eilam or Eillam is an Israeli name. Notable people with this name include:

- Avraham Eilam-Amzallag (born 1941), Israeli musician and composer
- Barak Eilam, Israeli electrical engineer and businessman
- Eldad Eilam, author of Reversing: Secrets of Reverse Engineering
- Esther Eillam (July 12, 1939 – July 29, 2023), Israeli feminist
- Tamar Eilam, Israeli-American computer scientist
- Uzi Eilam, Israeli general and director of the Israel Atomic Energy Commission
