= Deformulation =

Set of analytical procedures in chemistry

Deformulation refers to a set of analytical procedures used to separate and identify individual components of a formulated chemical substance. Deformulation applies methods of analytical chemistry and is often used to obtain competitive intelligence about chemical products. Deformulation is related to reverse engineering; however, the latter concept is most closely associated with procedures used to discover working principles of a device or a designed system through examination and disassembly of its structure. The term reverse engineering has become specifically and almost exclusively linked to the field of software engineering; whereas deformulation is a term more applicable to the field of chemical manufacturing. Deformulation of a multicomponent chemical mixture may occur in several contexts, including the investigation of causes of chemical product failure, competitive benchmarking, legal inquiry to obtain evidence of patent infringement, or new product research and development. Depending upon this context and upon the level of information sought, the requirements of analyses for deformulation may differ. Deformulation processes typically require the application of several analytical methods, and the selection of methods is dependent upon the degree of confidence required in the results. Methods of deformulation also have similarity to methods of forensic chemistry in which analytical procedures may be applied to discover the causes of material failure or to resolve a legal question.

== Deformulation related to intellectual property rights ==
In The United States, federal law recognizes a legal practice for the study of an item in hopes of obtaining a detailed understanding of the way in which it works for the purpose of creating duplicate or superior products without the benefit of having the plans for the original item. The studied item must first have been legally obtained, not stolen or otherwise misappropriated. The purpose of intellectual property protection is to provide incentives to invest and to advance the collective knowledge. It is felt that deformulation or reverse engineering helps to educate and promote healthy competition. It is considered to be a learning tool which provides a path to making new, competitive products that perform better and at lower cost than what is currently on the market. Deformulation is often considered along with benchmarking, patent mapping, and other competitor intelligence gathering processes as a means of conducting day-to-day business.

Other countries may have different conceptions about intellectual property rights and about legal allowances for deformulation or reverse engineering of items. For information concerning the legal status of deformulation practices in other countries throughout the world it is advisable to consult with an expert on intellectual property law.

== Deformulation procedures ==
A preliminary zeroth order analysis may be performed to answer fundamental questions about the nature of the unknown material. Methods that might be used for the preliminary analysis include spectroscopic methods, such as infrared spectroscopy or x-ray fluorescence spectroscopy. The results of the zeroth order characterization of the material inform subsequent choices in later stages of analysis.

A formulated chemical mixture may contain multiple phases, such as suspended or emulsified material. A first-order analysis of the material may involve the separation of phases. Centrifugation, extraction, and filtration are examples of methods which separate material in different phases. Centrifugation is effective to separate phases that differ in density. Extraction is effective to separate immiscible liquid phases. Filtration is effective to separate dispersed particles that are sufficiently large in size to be trapped in a filter. This initial separation may require the selection of appropriate solvents to either dissolve solid components or to act as a diluent for liquids. The quantitative determination of phases is often determined gravimetrically.

Once separated, each material phase is itself a chemical mixture to be further analyzed. A second-order analysis of each phase will typically involve a selection among available analytical methods to further separate these components. Analytical methods used on liquid phases might include distillation or one of a variety of chromatographic separation methods. Distillation separates the components of a liquid mixture according to differences in their boiling points. Chomatography separates components of a liquid or gaseous mixture according to differences in retention time as the mixture interacts with a stationary phase. Individual components thus separated can then be identified by a variety of detection methods, including infrared spectroscopy, Raman spectroscopy, mass spectrometry, and nuclear magnetic resonance spectrometry. Methods used to further analyze solids might include thermal analysis (such as thermogravimetric analysis or differential scanning calorimetry), x-ray diffraction to characterize crystalline solids, microscopy, pyrolysis, combustion analysis, or surface spectroscopic methods.

In some contexts further stages of analysis of the separated components may be required. The active ingredients of a formulated chemical product that differentiate it from another similar material may include proprietary ingredients or specific functional additives. Such ingredients that play a key role in the performance of the material in an application may require a third-order analysis to more completely characterize them. Some examples of functional additives include surfactants, emulsifiers, dispersants, adhesion promoters, leveling agents, dyes and pigments, antioxidants, preservatives, and optical brighteners. Practically every type of chemically formulated product is associated with its own formulary of likely functional additive choices that can fulfill some critical role in performance. Deformulation may thus require both a breakdown of material composition and also identification of the functional role of key ingredients.

=== Examples of chemical product types and functional additive types ===
Formulated chemical product	Possible functional additives	References
Laundry detergent	surfactants, bleaching agents, defoamers, enzymes, corrosion inhibitors, fragrances, thickening agents	
Offset lithographic ink	driers, waxes, antioxidants, rheology modifiers, lithography additives	
Interior house paint	pigments, extenders, initiators, chain transfer agents, coalescing agents, wetting agents, freeze-thaw stabilizers	
Laminating adhesive	colloidal stabilizer, anionic surfactants, nonionic surfactants, chain transfer agents, plasticizers, humectants	
Automotive engine oil	pour point depressants, viscosity modifiers, anti-oxidants, detergent inhibitors, anti-wear additives, friction modifiers	
Solder mask	photoinitiators, reactive diluents	
Carbonated beverage	preservatives, acidulants, sweeteners	

The analytical determination of a functional additive has particular problems associated with it. The concentration of a functional additive may be low compared to other ingredients; therefore, it may be difficult to detect. Proprietary ingredients are especially difficult to correctly identify. The functional role of a key component may not be obvious upon inspection. A key ingredient may be undisclosed by the maker of the material, but rather kept as a trade secret. Careful study of trade literature and patent filings associated with the manufacturer may aid the analyst in the characterization.
