= AI-assisted reverse engineering =

Branch of computer science

AI-assisted reverse engineering (AIARE) is a branch of computer science that leverages artificial intelligence, notably machine learning strategies, to augment and automate the process of reverse engineering. The latter involves breaking down a product, system, or process to comprehend its structure, design, and functionality. AIARE was primarily introduced in the early years of the 21st century, witnessing substantial advancements from the mid-2010s onwards.

== Overview ==
Conventionally, reverse engineering is conducted by specialists who dismantle a system to grasp its working principles, often for the purposes of reproduction, modification, enhancement of compatibility, or forensic examination. This method, while efficient, can be laborious and time-intensive, particularly when dealing with intricate software or hardware systems.

AIARE integrates machine learning algorithms to either partially automate or augment this process. It is capable of detecting patterns, relationships, structures, and potential vulnerabilities within the analyzed system, frequently surpassing human experts in speed and accuracy. This has rendered AIARE a critical tool in numerous fields, including cybersecurity, software development, and hardware design and analysis.

== Techniques ==
AIARE encompasses several AI methodologies:

- Supervised learning employs tagged data to train models to recognize system components, their operations, and their interconnections. This method is particularly helpful in software analysis to discover vulnerabilities or enhance compatibility.
- Unsupervised learning is utilized to detect concealed patterns and structures in untagged data. It proves beneficial in comprehending complex systems where there's no evident labeling or mapping of components.
- Reinforcement learning is employed to build models that progressively refine their system understanding through a process of trial and error. This method is often implemented when deciphering a system's functionality under various circumstances or configurations.
- Deep learning is employed for analysis of high-dimensional data. For instance, deep learning techniques can aid in examining the layout and connections of integrated circuits (ICs), substantially reducing the manual effort required for reverse engineering.

== Benefits ==
=== Usable security ===
AIARE expands usable security as reverse engineering is traditionally slow and highly specialized as it produces dense, low-level information (usually in Assembly or C) when using tools like Ghidra. The use of multiple different methods to interface with models today (such as through chat bots like ChatGPT) greatly reduces the barrier to entry by providing a clear way to interact with the user and even providing meaningful decompiled source code. In addition, either done automatically or through prompt engineering, a model is capable of producing a high-level summary and explanation of its reverse engineering efforts in human-readable form that doesn't require much knowledge on code.

=== Speedup ===
AIARE is capable of processing data much faster than humans, providing a boost in speed when analyzing said data. In the context of computer security, this can greatly speed up incident management or response and malware detection as AIARE can be automated to drastically reduce the manual effort usually associated with reverse engineering.

== Limitations ==
In an effort to improve readability for reverse engineering, AI-generated code may introduce erroneous bugs not present in the source. This compromises the correctness of the code if not carefully validated and will throw off reverse engineering efforts. Additionally, AIARE's weakness in zero-shot prompting makes gathering accurate data without reference data in the prompt more inconsistent, thus requiring a user to provide some quality data of their own that hurts its usability.

== See also ==
- Applications of artificial intelligence
- Reverse Engineer Anything
