= Geographic center of the United States =

Central location of the 48 or 50 states

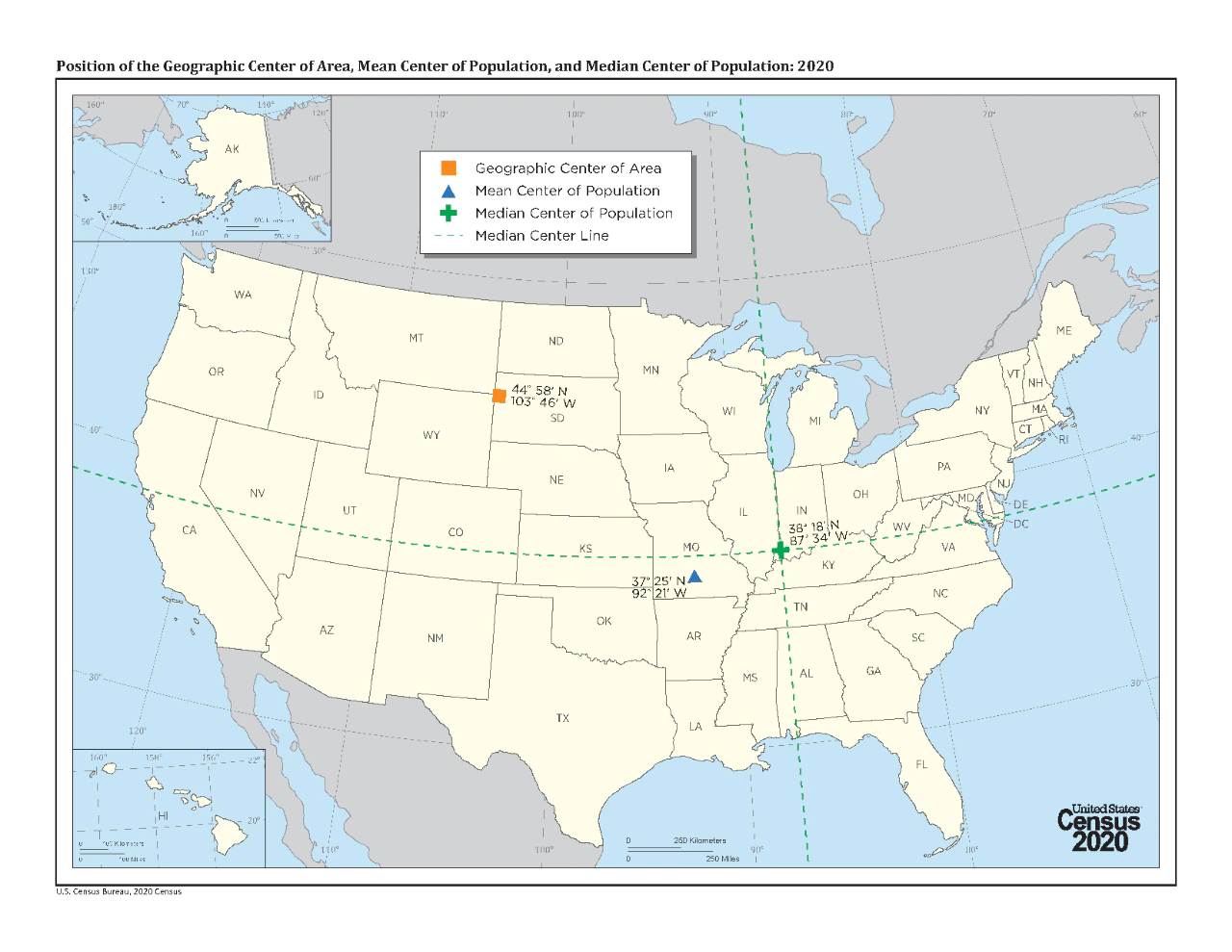
Map of the position of the U.S. geographic center of area, mean center of population, and median center of population, 2020 (U.S. Census Bureau)

The geographic center of the United States is a point approximately 20 miles (32 km) north of Belle Fourche, South Dakota, at 44°58′2.08″N 103°46′17.60″W. It has been regarded as such by the United States Coast and Geodetic Survey and the U.S. National Geodetic Survey (NGS) since the additions of Alaska and Hawaii to the United States in 1959.

== Overview ==
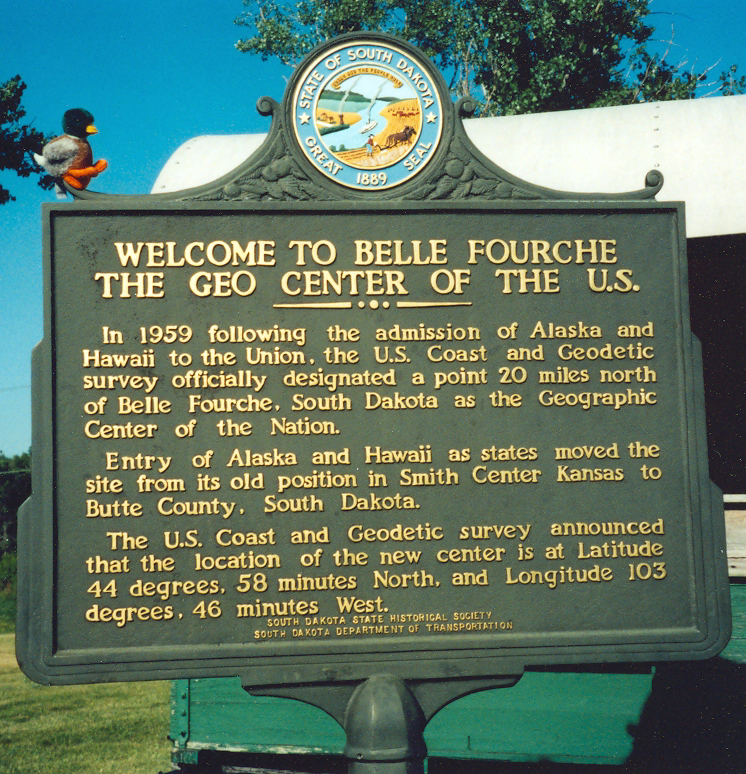
Belle Fourche, South Dakota

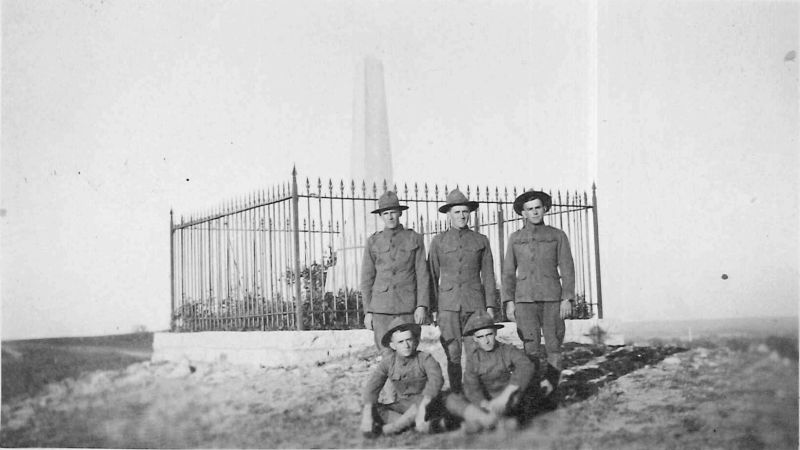
The old marker for Geographic Center of the U.S. at Smith Center, Kansas in 1918

This is distinct from the contiguous geographic center, which has not changed since the 1912 admissions of New Mexico and Arizona to the 48 contiguous United States, and falls near the town of Lebanon, Kansas. This served as the overall geographic center of the United States for 47 years, until the 1959 admissions of Alaska and Hawaii moved the geographic center of the overall United States approximately 550 miles (885 km) northwest by north.

While any measurement of the exact center of a land mass will always be imprecise due to changing shorelines and other factors, the NGS coordinates identify the center of the fifty states as an uninhabited parcel of private pastureland approximately 12 miles (19 km) east of the cornerpoint where the South Dakota–Wyoming–Montana borders meet. According to the NGS data sheet, the actual marker is "set in an irregular mass of concrete 36 inches below the surface of the ground."

For public commemoration, a nearby proxy marker is located in a park in Belle Fourche, where one will find a flag atop a small concrete slab bearing a United States Coast and Geodetic Survey Reference Marker.

== Contiguous United States ==
Geographic center of the contiguous United States

The geographic center of the 48 contiguous or conterminous United States, determined in a 1918 survey, is located at 39°50′N 98°35′W, about 2.6 miles (4.2 km) northwest of the center of Lebanon, Kansas, approximately 12 miles (19 km) south of the Kansas–Nebraska border. The determination is accurate to about 20 miles (32 km).

The NGS coordinates are recognized in a historical marker in a small park at the intersection of AA Road and K-191, although again, this will always be slightly off due changing shorelines and other factors. It is accessible by a turn-off from U.S. Route 281.

It is distinct from the geographic center of the 50 United States located at a point northeast of Belle Fourche, South Dakota, reflecting the 1959 additions of the states of Alaska and Hawaii.

In a technical glitch, a farmstead northeast of Potwin, Kansas, became the default geolocation of 600 million IP addresses (due to a lack of fine granularity) when the Massachusetts-based digital mapping company MaxMind changed the putative geographic center of the contiguous United States from 39°50′N 98°35′W to 38°N 97°W.

=== Marker ===
In order to protect the privacy of the private land owner where the point identified by the 1918 survey falls, a proxy marker was erected in 1940 about half a mile (800 m) away, at the 130/AA intersection (39.8282°N 98.5796°W).

Its inscription reads:

The GEOGRAPHIC CENTER of the UNITED STATES
LAT. 39°50' LONG. −98°35'
NE 1/4 – SE 1/4 – S32 – T2S – R11W
Located by L.T. Hagadorn of Paulette & Wilson – Engineers and L.A. Beardslee – County Engineer. From data furnished by United States Coast and Geodetic Survey.
Sponsored by Lebanon Hub Club. Lebanon, Kansas. April 25, 1940

An American flag usually flies atop a pole placed on the monument. A covered picnic area and the U.S. Center Chapel, a small eight-pew chapel, are nearby.

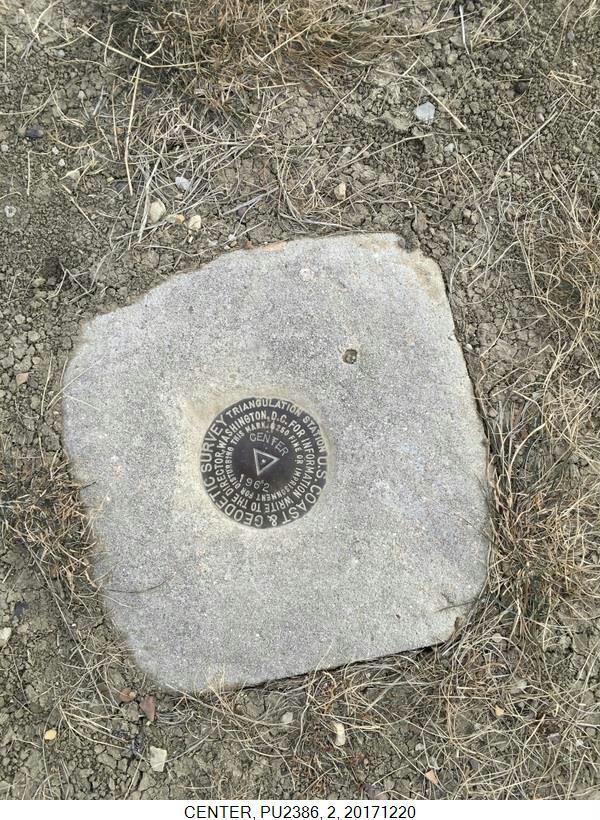
The survey marker of the geographic center of the 50 United States

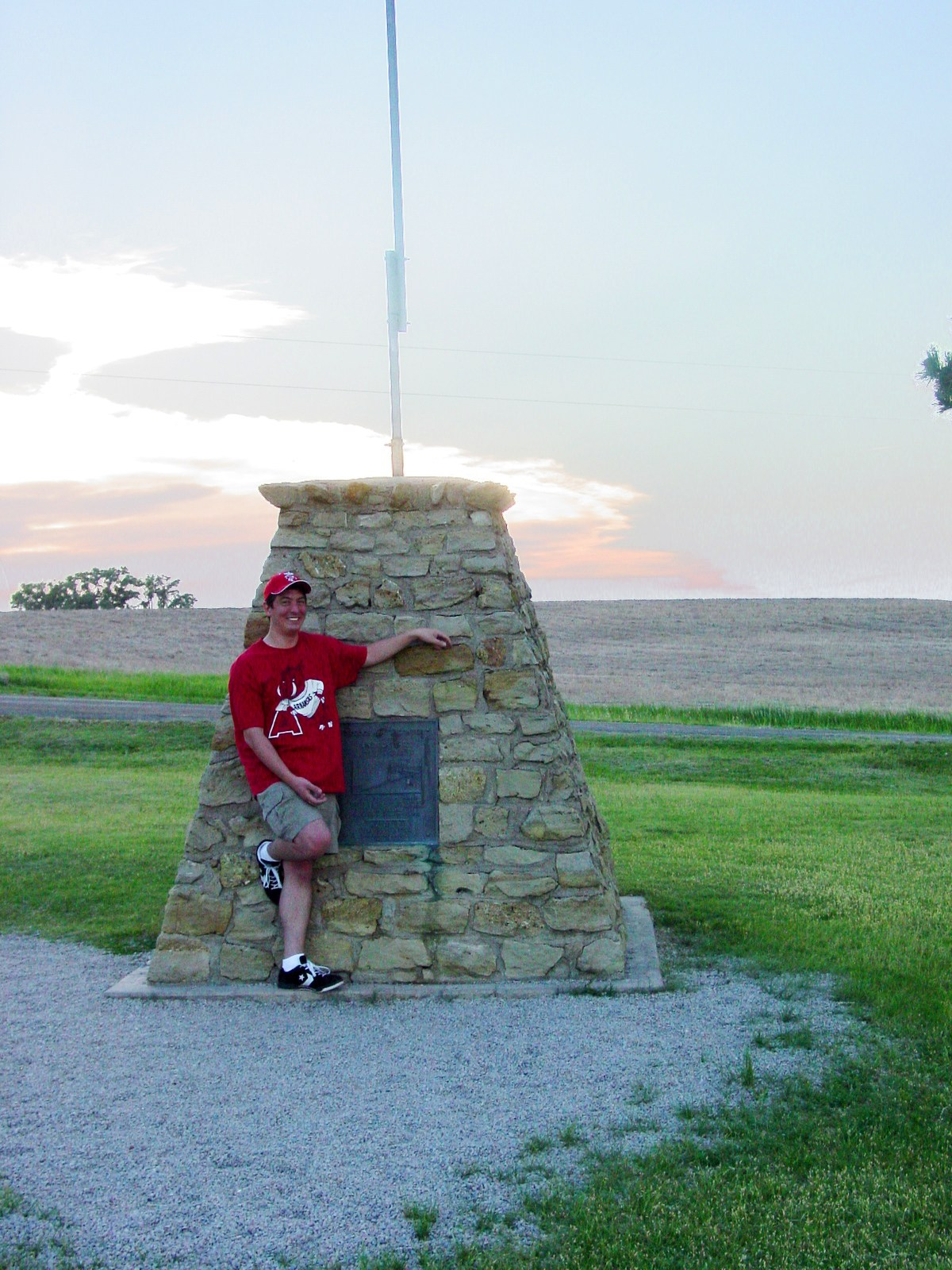
The marker located near Lebanon, Kansas

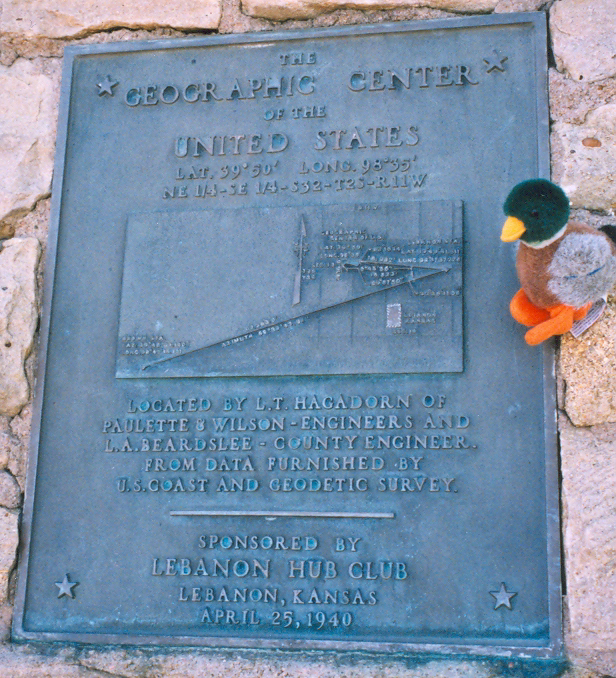
A close-up of the plaque on the historical marker

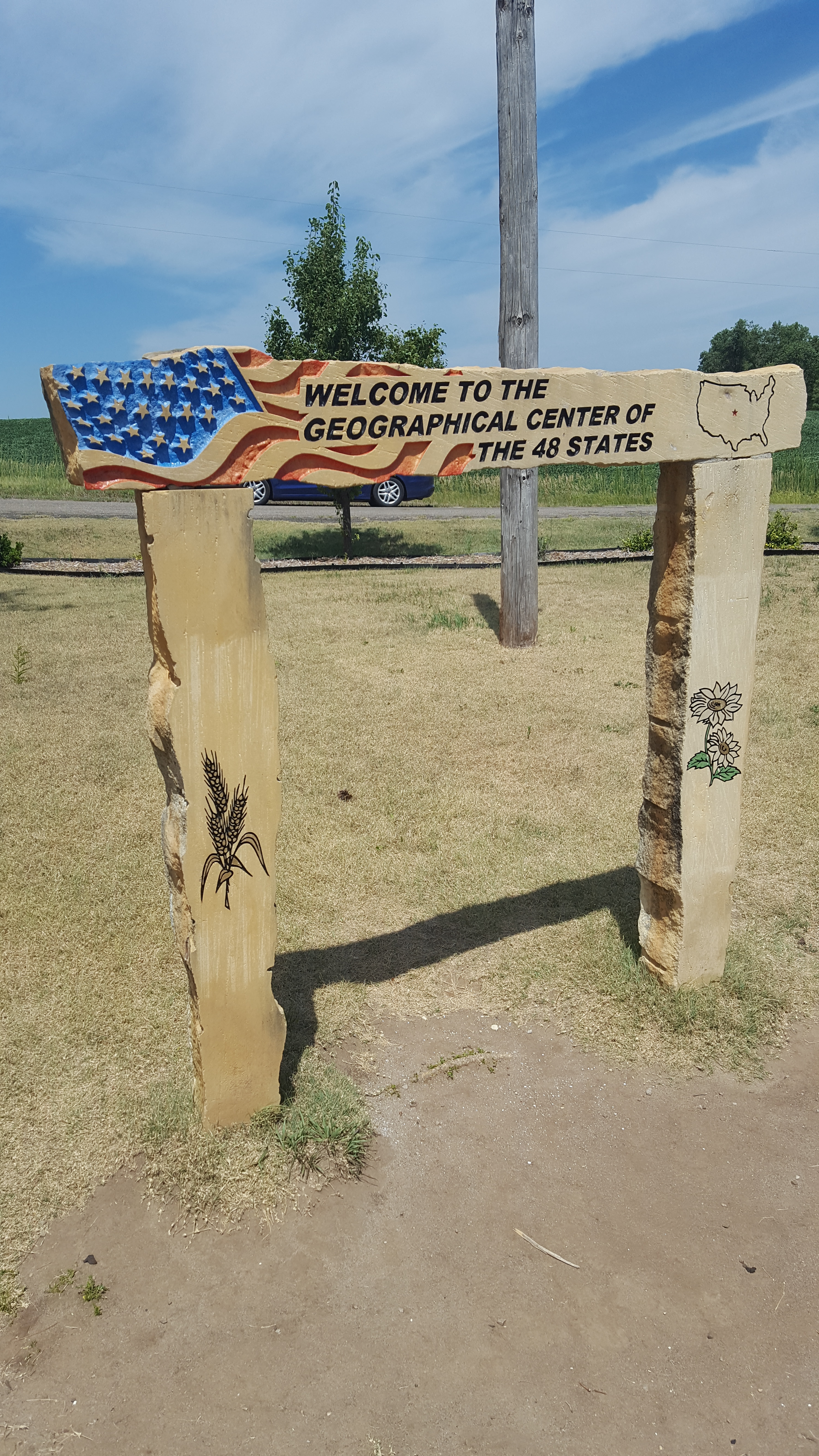
An additional monument adjacent to the marker

=== Method of measurement ===
In 1918, the United States Coast and Geodetic Survey found this location by balancing on a point a cardboard cutout shaped like the U.S. This method was accurate to within 20 miles (32 km), but while the Geodetic Survey no longer endorses any location as the center of the U.S., the identification of Lebanon, Kansas, has remained.

=== Cultural references ===
The geographic center of the contiguous United States is mentioned in Neil Gaiman's American Gods as a neutral ground where the modern and the old gods can meet despite the war between them.

In the 1969 Disney movie The Computer Wore Tennis Shoes, the final question of the college knowledge program is, "A small Midwest city is located exactly on an area designated as the 'geographic center of the United States.' For ten points and $100,000, can you tell us the name of that city?" The answer of Lebanon, Kansas is accepted as correct.

A 2021 Jeep Super Bowl commercial titled "The Middle", starring Bruce Springsteen, features the U.S. Center Chapel in Lebanon, Kansas.

Belle Fourche, South Dakota, is referenced as the geographic center of the U.S. in "A Serpent's Tooth: A Longmire Mystery Book 9" by Craig Johnson.

The television show Supernatural's bunker is located in Lebanon, KS.

== See also ==
- Center of population
- Geographic centers of the United States
- Pole of inaccessibility
- Mean center of the United States population
- Median center of the United States population
- United States Coast and Geodetic Survey (USC&GS)
