= Lebanon, Kansas =

City in Smith County, Kansas

- City
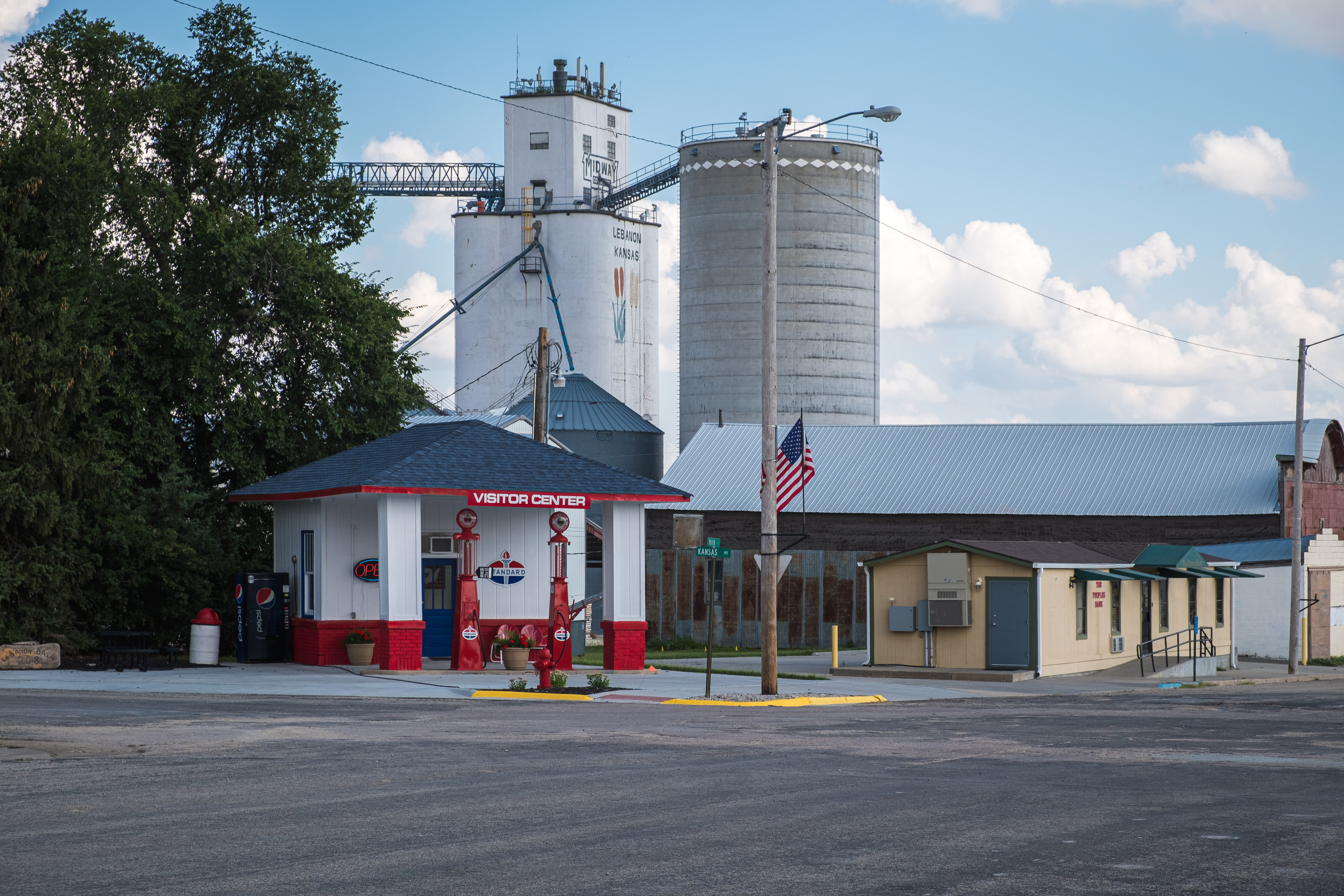
- Visitor center (2019)

- Location within Smith County and Kansas

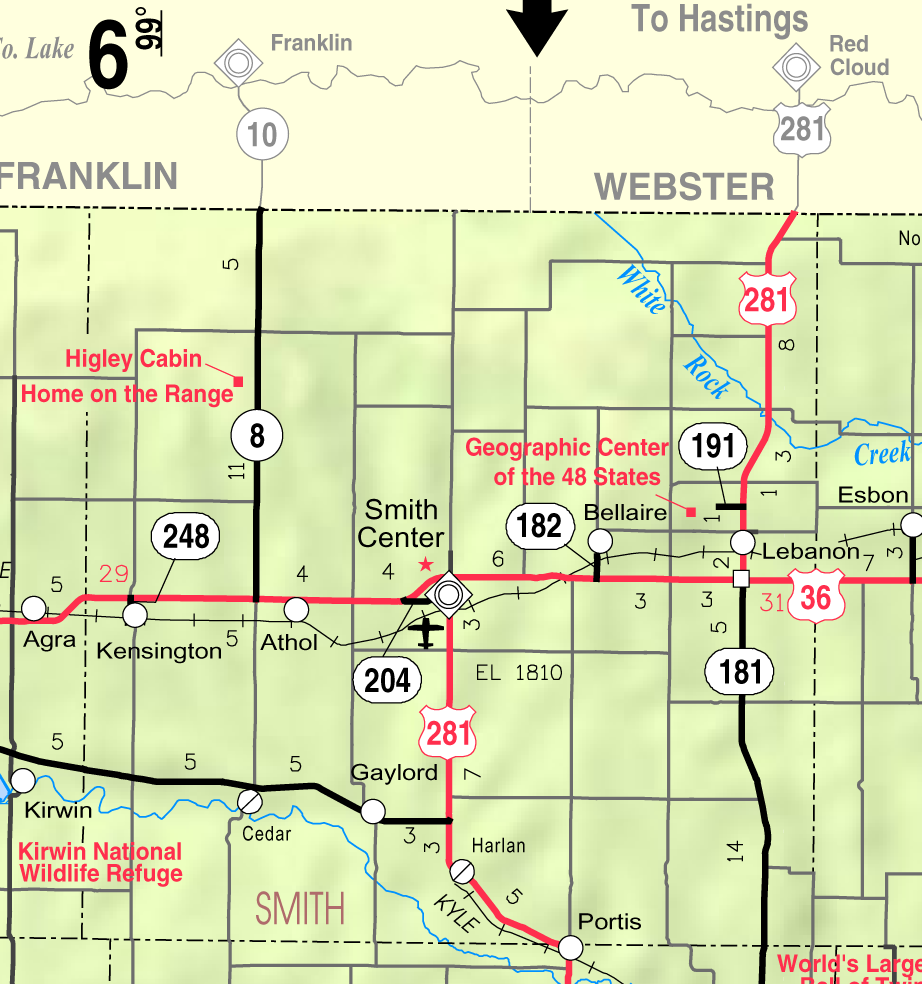
- KDOT map of Smith County (legend)
- Coordinates: 39°48′37″N 98°33′26″W
- Country: United States
- State: Kansas
- County: Smith
- Founded: 1875
- Incorporated: 1889
- Named for: Lebanon, Kentucky

Government
  - Type: Mayor–Council

Area
  - Total: 0.32 sq mi (0.84 km^{2})
  - Land: 0.32 sq mi (0.84 km^{2})
  - Water: 0 sq mi (0.00 km^{2})
- Elevation: 1,844 ft (562 m)

Population (2020)
  - Total: 178
  - Density: 550/sq mi (210/km^{2})
- Time zone: UTC−6 (CST)
  - Summer (DST): UTC−5 (CDT)
- ZIP Code: 66952
- Area code: 785
- FIPS code: 20-39100
- GNIS ID: 2395665

Lebanon is a city in Smith County, Kansas, United States. As of the 2020 census, the population of the city was 178, which is 40 fewer than the 2010 census. The geographic center of the contiguous United States is located 2.6 miles (4.2 km) northwest of the city, with a monument marking the location, and the city was recorded as having the lowest minimum temperature ever recorded in Kansas in 1905.

== History ==
Lebanon was founded in 1876 at a site about 4 miles (6.4 km) distant from its present site. It was moved to the new site in about 1887–1888. Lebanon is named after Lebanon, Kentucky.

In 1918, a scientific survey established the geographic center of the 48 contiguous US states about 2.6 miles (4.2 km) northwest of Lebanon, and a monument was subsequently erected at the site. The geographic center of all 50 of the US states is located near Belle Fourche, South Dakota.

On October 2, 2006, Lebanon was the focus of a study of rural flight, as local farmer Randall Warner was featured in a New York Times story about the problems faced by communities such as Lebanon.

On May 27, 2013, a large and intense EF-3 tornado touched down North East of the small town. Traveling East, it struck multiple small farm structures. The Tornado Intercept Vehicle 2 (TIV-2) crew, composed of Brandon Ivey, Sean Casey, and the late Herb Stein, intercepted the tornado on Ee Road, North East of town. The vehicle was struck by multiple pieces of debris, opening the roof hatch, opening a side door, spinning the roof mounted turret housing the IMAX camera, as well as Sean Casey, and sparking on the polycarbonate windshield. A tree branch also landed in the vehicle. Before being struck by a large piece of sheet metal, the anemometer recorded wind speeds of 175 mph (281.6 kp/h). These were the highest recorded wind speeds inside of a tornado. The massive wedge tornado tracked North of town, continuing East until dissipation, just North of the neighboring community of Esbon, Kansas.

== Geography ==
According to the United States Census Bureau, the city has a total area of 0.316 square miles (0.818 km^{2}), all land. On February 13, 1905, the temperature fell to −40 °F (−40 °C), the lowest minimum temperature ever recorded in Kansas.

== Demographics ==
Historical population
| Census | Pop. | Note | %± |
|---|---|---|---|
| 1890 | 301 | | — |
| 1900 | 590 | | 96.0% |
| 1910 | 731 | | 23.9% |
| 1920 | 822 | | 12.4% |
| 1930 | 723 | | −12.0% |
| 1940 | 652 | | −9.8% |
| 1950 | 610 | | −6.4% |
| 1960 | 583 | | −4.4% |
| 1970 | 517 | | −11.3% |
| 1980 | 440 | | −14.9% |
| 1990 | 364 | | −17.3% |
| 2000 | 303 | | −16.8% |
| 2010 | 218 | | −28.1% |
| 2020 | 178 | | −18.3% |
U.S. Decennial Census

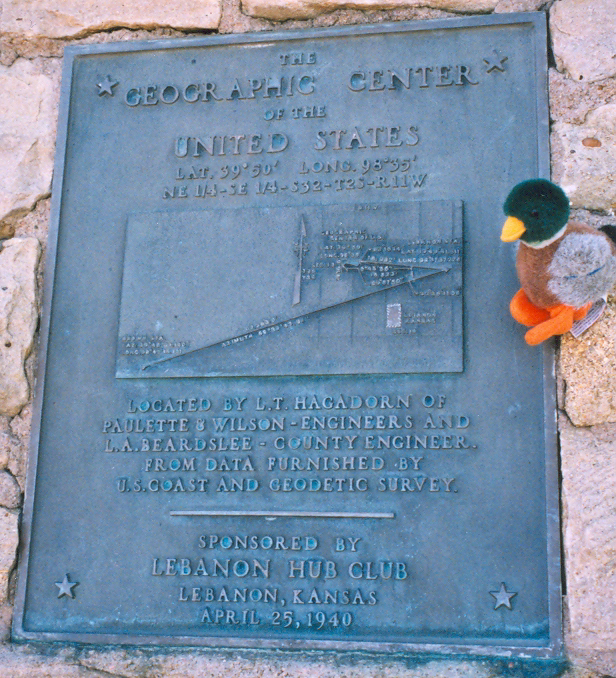
Plaque on Monument near Lebanon (2007)

=== 2020 census ===
The 2020 United States census counted 178 people, 102 households, and 50 families in Lebanon. The population density was 552.8 per square mile (213.4/km^{2}). There were 139 housing units at an average density of 431.7 per square mile (166.7/km^{2}). The racial makeup was 93.26% (166) white or European American (90.45% non-Hispanic white), 1.69% (3) black or African-American, 0.56% (1) Native American or Alaska Native, and 4.49% (8) from two or more races. Hispanic or Latino of any race was 2.81% (5) of the population.

Of the 102 households, 16.7% had children under the age of 18; 37.3% were married couples living together; 29.4% had a female householder with no spouse or partner present. 47.1% of households consisted of individuals and 27.5% had someone living alone who was 65 years of age or older. The average household size was 2.1 and the average family size was 2.5. The percent of those with a bachelor's degree or higher was estimated to be 18.5% of the population.

14.6% of the population was under the age of 18, 4.5% from 18 to 24, 14.0% from 25 to 44, 35.4% from 45 to 64, and 31.5% who were 65 years of age or older. The median age was 58.0 years. For every 100 females, there were 107.0 males. For every 100 females ages 18 and older, there were 105.4 males.

The 2016–2020 5-year American Community Survey estimates show that the median household income was $33,333 (with a margin of error of +/- $9,864) and the median family income was $46,250 (+/- $21,160). Males had a median income of $31,406 (+/- $9,257) versus $28,750 (+/- $4,818) for females. The median income for those above 16 years old was $30,313 (+/- $3,703). Approximately, 9.1% of families and 17.1% of the population were below the poverty line, including 60.6% of those under the age of 18 and 7.2% of those ages 65 or over.

=== 2010 census ===
As of the census of 2010, there were 218 people, 118 households, and 60 families residing in the city. The population density was 681.3 inhabitants per square mile (263.1/km^{2}). There were 183 housing units at an average density of 571.9 per square mile (220.8/km^{2}). The racial makeup of the city was 95.9% White, 0.5% Native American, 0.5% Asian, and 3.2% from two or more races. Hispanic or Latino of any race were 3.2% of the population.

There were 118 households, of which 16.9% had children under the age of 18 living with them, 42.4% were married couples living together, 4.2% had a female householder with no husband present, 4.2% had a male householder with no wife present, and 49.2% were non-families. 46.6% of all households were made up of individuals, and 22.9% had someone living alone who was 65 years of age or older. The average household size was 1.85 and the average family size was 2.62.

The median age in the city was 51.3 years. 17.4% of residents were under 18; 2.8% were between the ages of 18 and 24; 14.8% were from 25 to 44; 40.8% were from 45 to 64; and 24.3% were 65 years of age or older. The gender makeup of the city was 48.2% male and 51.8% female.

== Area attractions ==
- Geographic center of the contiguous United States
- Kansas Historical Marker – The Geographic Center

== Government ==
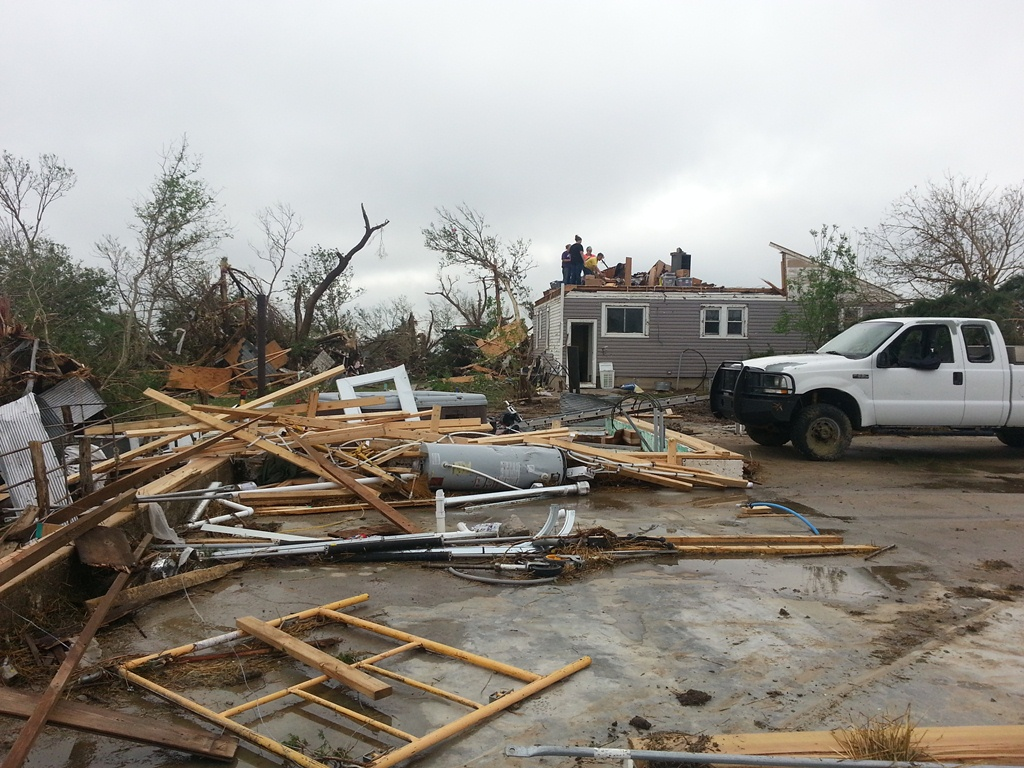
Tornado damage in late May 2013

The Lebanon government consists of a mayor and five council members. The council meets the second Tuesday of each month at 7 p.m., at City Hall, 404 Main St.

== Education ==
Lebanon schools merged and eventually closed as the population declined. The community is served by Smith Center USD 237 public school district.

The Lebanon Bronchos (or Broncos) won the Kansas State High School boys 1A basketball championship in 1977.

== In popular culture ==
The documentary The Return of the Buffalo: Restoring the Great American Prairie details the story and history of Lebanon amongst other Great Plains villages.

During Super Bowl LV, Jeep aired an ad featuring Bruce Springsteen lighting a candle at a chapel in Lebanon.
