= Mean center of the United States population =

Demographic statistic

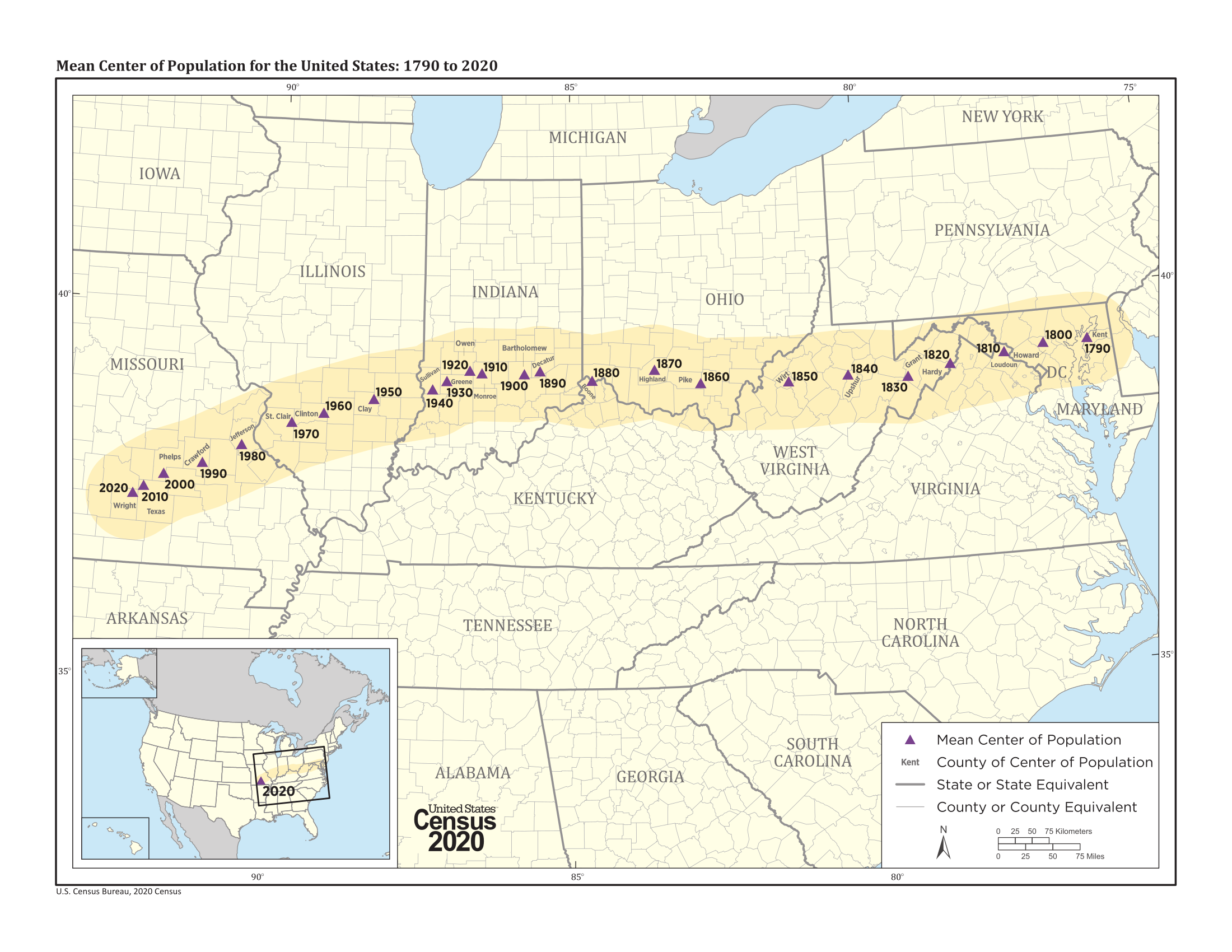
Map showing changes to the mean center of population for the United States, 1790–2020 (US Census Bureau)

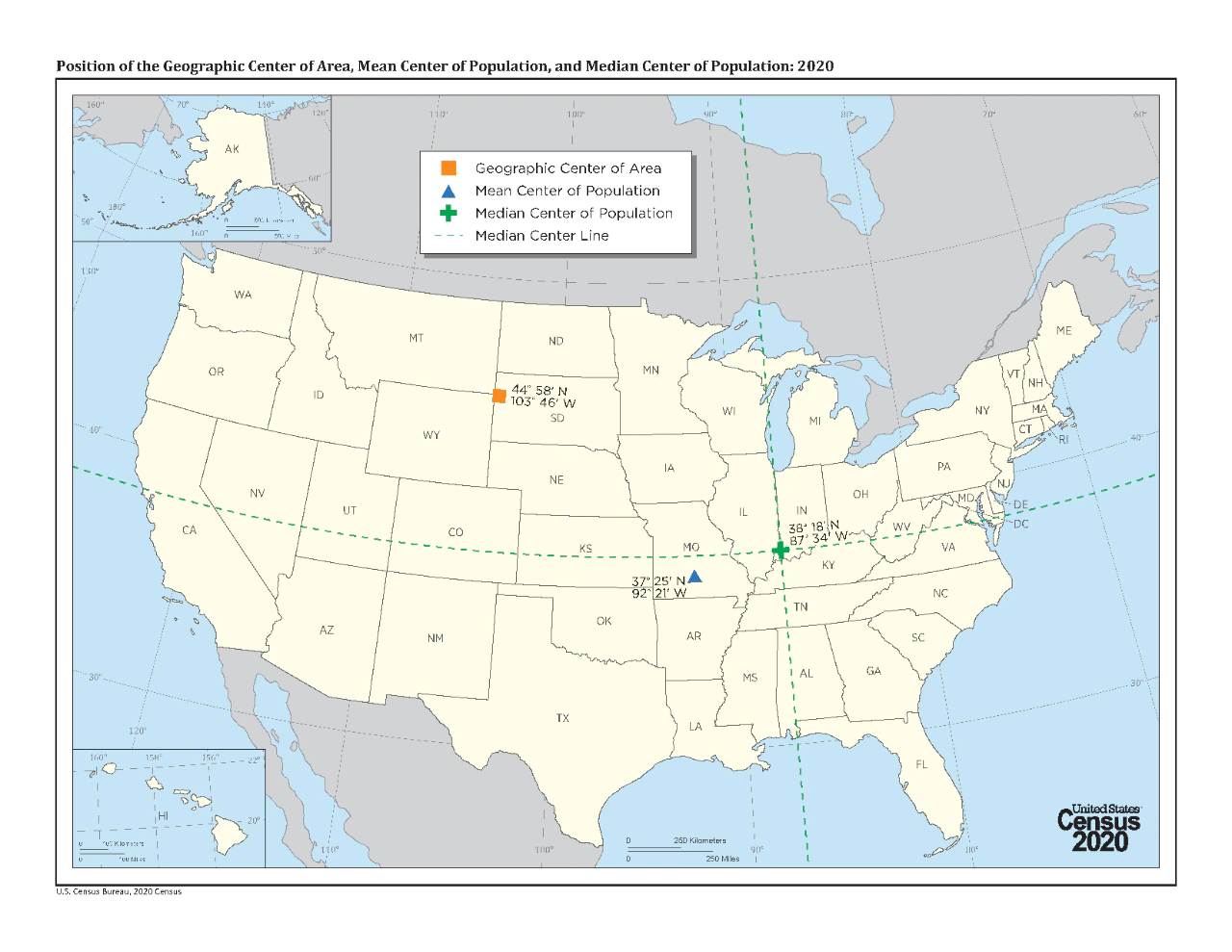
Map of the Position of the U.S. Geographic Center of Area, Mean Center of Population, and Median Center of Population, 2020 (U.S. Census Bureau)

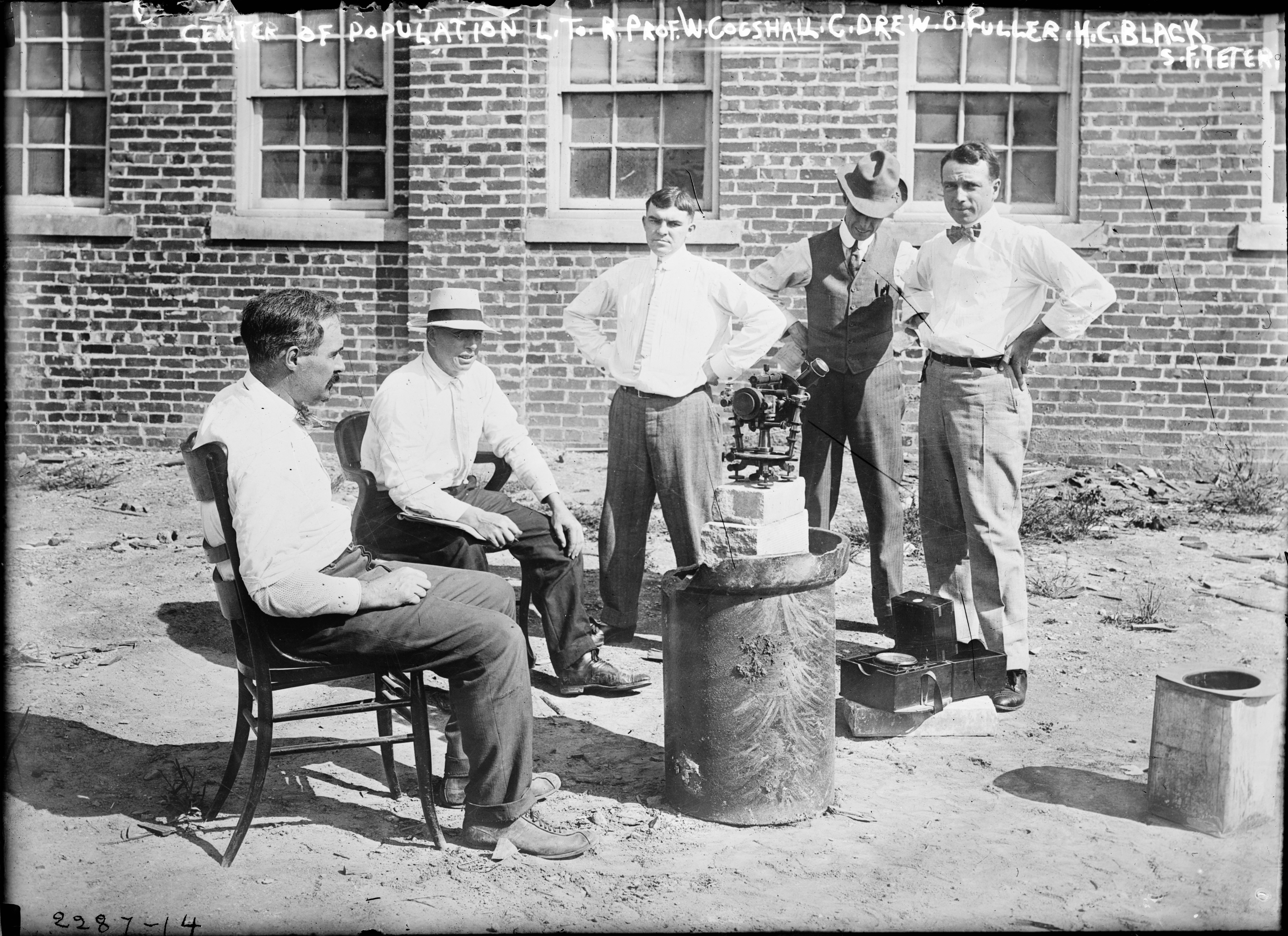
The center of the US population, 13th census (1910), near Bloomington, Indiana

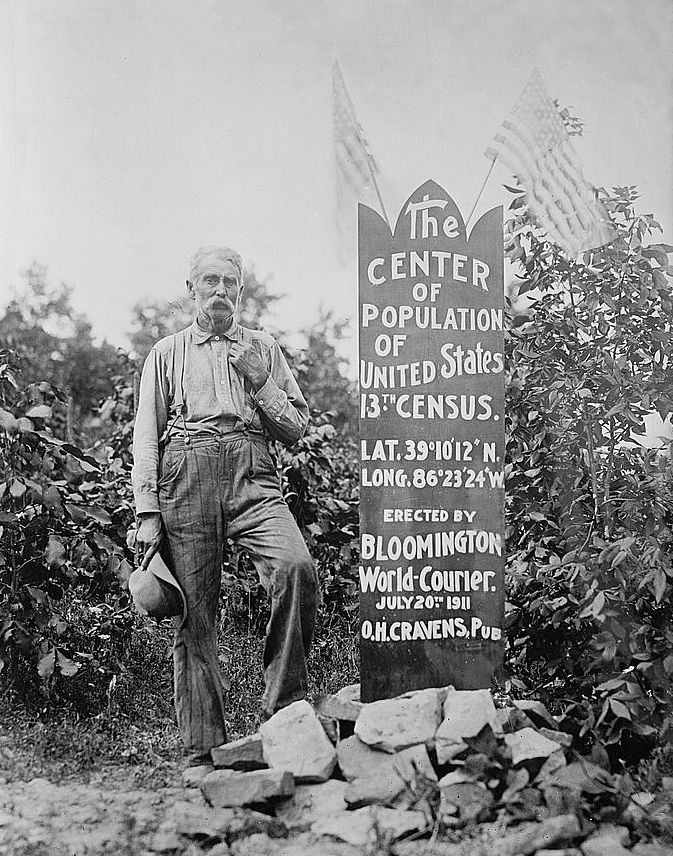
The center of the US population, 13th census (1910), near Bloomington, Indiana

The mean center of the United States population is determined by the United States Census Bureau from the results of each national census. The Bureau defines it as follows:

The concept of the center of population as used by the U.S. Census Bureau is that of a balance point. The center of population is the point at which an imaginary, weightless, rigid, and flat (no elevation effects) surface representation of the 50 states (or 48 conterminous states for calculations made prior to 1960) and the District of Columbia would balance if weights of identical size were placed on it so that each weight represented the location of one person. More specifically, this calculation is called the mean center of population.

After moving roughly 600 miles (966 km) west by south during the 19th century, the shift in the mean center of population during the 20th century was less pronounced, moving 324 miles (521 km) west and 101 miles (163 km) south. Nearly 79% of the overall southerly movement happened between 1950 and 2000.

One occasional confusion is the misconception that the point splits the US population into two equal halves, such that half of Americans live east of the point, and the other half west of it, however, this is actually a property of the median center of US population, which is not weighted by geographic distance and lies in Gibson County, Indiana.

== Location information since 1790 ==
US Census	County	Location description	Decimal coordinates	Distance from previous point
1790	Kent County, Maryland (Note: In the first census (1790), the mean population center was about 7.4 miles northwest by west of Chestertown, Maryland.)	23 miles east of Baltimore	39.27500°N 76.18667°W	n/a
1800	Howard County, Maryland	18 miles west of Baltimore	39.26833°N 76.94167°W	52 miles (84 km)
1810	Loudoun County, Virginia	40 miles west-northwest of Washington, D.C.	39.19167°N 77.62000°W	47 miles (75 km)
1820	Hardy County, West Virginia (Note: The mean population centers of 1820, 1830, 1840 and 1850 were in Virginia at the time of their censuses, before West Virginia's split from Virginia in 1863.)	16 miles east of Moorefield	39.09500°N 78.55000°W	64 miles (103 km)
1830	Grant County, West Virginia	19 miles west-southwest of Moorefield	38.96500°N 79.28167°W	51 miles (81 km)
1840	Upshur County, West Virginia	16 miles south of Clarksburg	39.03333°N 80.30000°W	70 miles (113 km)
1850	Wirt County, West Virginia	23 miles southeast of Parkersburg	38.98333°N 81.31667°W	70 miles (113 km)
1860	Pike County, Ohio	20 miles southeast of Chillicothe	39.00667°N 82.81333°W	103 miles (166 km)
1870	Highland County, Ohio	48 miles northeast of Cincinnati	39.20000°N 83.59500°W	54 miles (87 km)
1880	Boone County, Kentucky	8 miles southwest of Cincinnati	39.06889°N 84.66111°W	74 miles (119 km)
1890	Decatur County, Indiana	20 miles east of Columbus	39.19889°N 85.54806°W	61 miles (99 km)
1900	Bartholomew County, Indiana	6 miles southeast of Columbus	39.16000°N 85.81500°W	18 miles (30 km)
1910	Monroe County, Indiana	in the city of Bloomington	39.17000°N 86.53889°W	50 miles (80 km)
1920	Owen County, Indiana	8 miles south-southeast of Spencer	39.17250°N 86.72083°W	13 miles (20 km)
1930	Greene County, Indiana	3 miles northeast of Linton	39.06250°N 87.13500°W	29 miles (46 km)
1940	Sullivan County, Indiana	2 miles east-southeast of Carlisle	38.94833°N 87.37639°W	17 miles (27 km)
1950	Richland County, Illinois (Note: Computation method used until 1950.); Clay County, Illinois (Note: Current computation method.)	8 miles north-northwest of Olney; 3 miles northeast of Louisville	38.83917°N 88.15917°W; 38.80417°N 88.36889°W	54 miles (87 km); 69 miles (110 km)
1960	Clinton County, Illinois (Note: The addition of Alaska and Hawaii to the union in 1959 contributed to moving the mean center of population about 2 miles (3.2 km) farther south and about 10 miles (16 km) farther west in the 1960 census.)	6.5 miles northwest of Centralia	38.59944°N 89.20972°W	58 miles (93 km)
1970	St. Clair County, Illinois	5 miles east-southeast of Mascoutah	38.46306°N 89.70611°W	34 miles (55 km)
1980	Jefferson County, Missouri	0.3 mile west of DeSoto	38.13694°N 90.57389°W	60 miles (96 km)
1990	Crawford County, Missouri	9.7 miles southeast of Steelville	37.87222°N 91.21528°W	44 miles (71 km)
2000	Phelps County, Missouri	2.8 miles east of Edgar Springs	37.696987°N 91.809567°W	41 miles (66 km)
2010	Texas County, Missouri	2.7 miles northeast of Plato	37.517534°N 92.173096°W	25 miles (40 km)
2020	Wright County, Missouri	15 miles northeast of Hartville	37.415725°N 92.346525°W	12 miles (19 km)

== See also ==
- Center of population
- Geographic center of the United States
- Geographic center of the contiguous United States
