= Median center of the United States population =

Demographic statistic

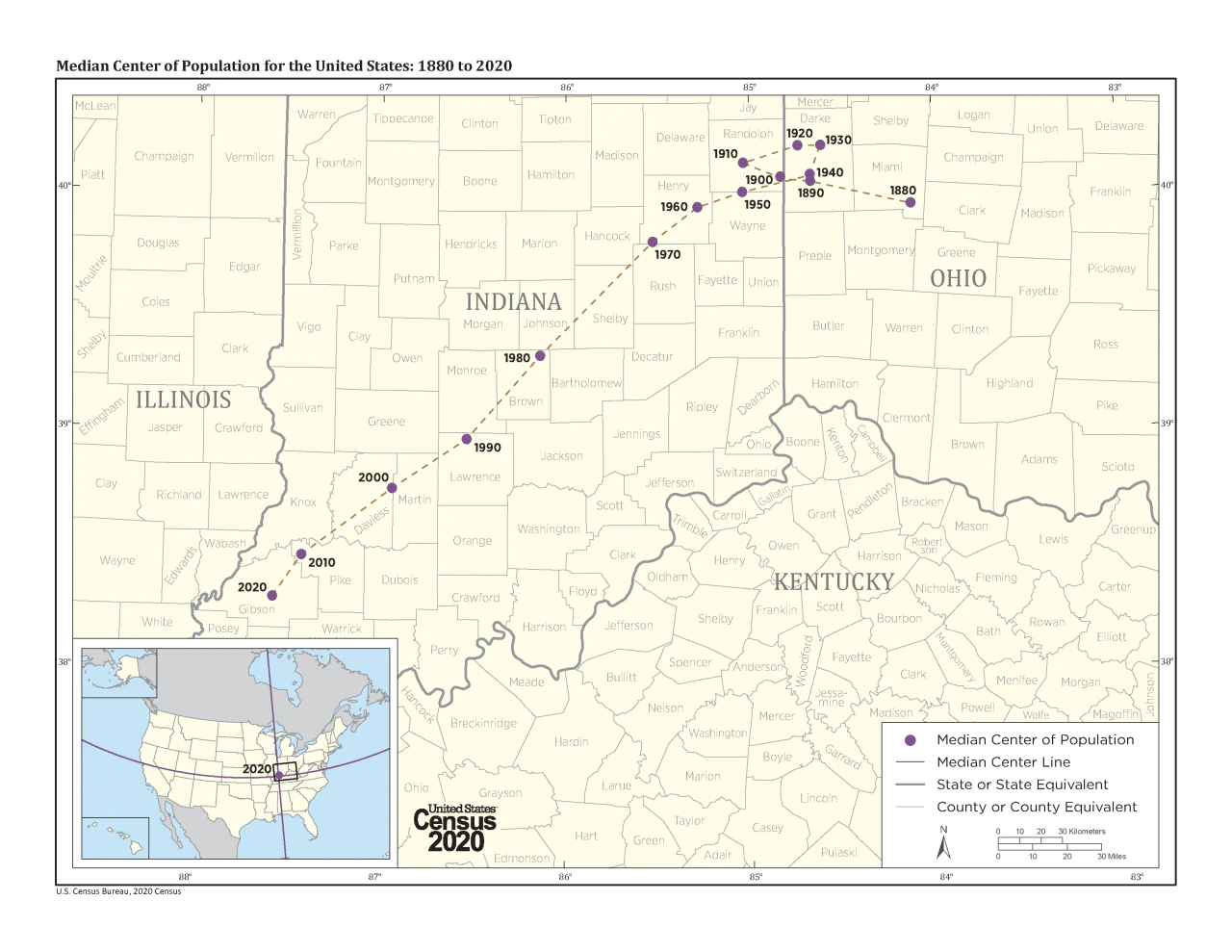
Map showing the locations of the U.S. median center of population, 1880–2020 (U.S. Census Bureau)

The median center of U.S. population is determined by the United States Census Bureau from the results of each census. The Bureau defines it as follows:

The point through which a north-south line and an east-west line each divides the total population of the country in half.

The population in question includes that of the 50 U.S. states and Washington, D.C., but not the U.S. territories. As of the 2020 U.S. census, this places roughly 165.7 million Americans living on each side of a longitude line passing through a location in Gibson County, Indiana, and the same number living on each side of a latitude line through the same point.

During the 20th century the median center of U.S. population moved roughly 180 miles (290 km) southwest, from a location in Randolph County, Indiana to a location in Daviess County, Indiana. The majority of this southwest shift happened in the second half of the century, as the center shifted within a narrow circular band between 1900 and 1950 – all within roughly 25 miles (40 km) of the 1900 starting point in Randolph County.

== See also ==
- Center of population
- Geographic center of the United States
- Geographic center of the contiguous United States
