= Architecture =

Art and technique of designing buildings

In adding the dome to the Florence Cathedral (Italy) in the early 15th century, the architect Filippo Brunelleschi not only transformed the building and the city, but also the role and status of the architect.

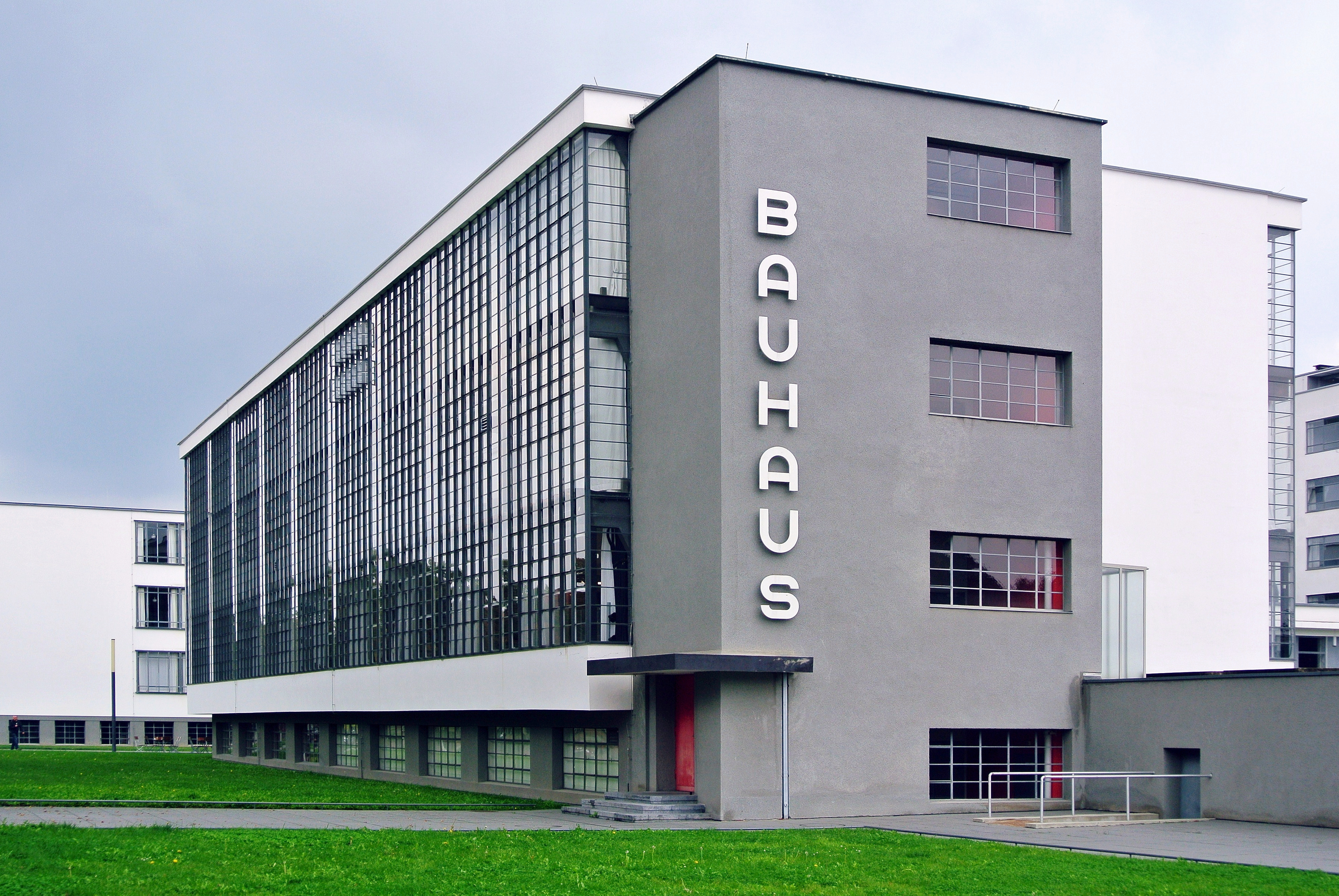
Bauhaus building (Germany). The Bauhaus style co-started modernist architecture.

Architecture is the study and practice of designing structures, especially habitable ones. It utilizes civil engineering techniques, but is considered a visual art. It is both the process and the product of sketching, conceiving, planning, designing, and constructing buildings or other structures. The term comes from Latin architectura; from Ancient Greek ἀρχιτέκτων (arkhitéktōn) 'architect'; from ἀρχι- (arkhi-) 'chief' and τέκτων (téktōn) 'creator'. Architectural works, in the material form of buildings, are often perceived as cultural symbols and as works of art. Historical civilizations are often identified with their surviving architectural achievements.

The practice of architecture itself, which began in the prehistoric era, has been used as a way of expressing culture by civilizations on all seven continents. For this reason, architecture is considered to be a form of art. Texts on architecture have been written since ancient times. The earliest surviving text on architectural theories is the 1st century BC treatise De architectura by the Roman architect Vitruvius, according to whom a good building embodies firmitas, utilitas, and venustas (durability, utility, and beauty). Centuries later, Leon Battista Alberti developed his ideas further, seeing beauty as an objective quality of buildings to be found in their proportions. In the 19th century, Louis Sullivan declared that "form follows function". "Function" began to replace the classical "utility" and was understood to include not only practical but also aesthetic, psychological, and cultural dimensions. The idea of sustainable architecture was introduced in the late 20th century.

Architecture began as rural, oral vernacular architecture that developed from trial and error to successful replication. Ancient urban architecture was preoccupied with building religious structures and buildings symbolizing the political power of rulers until Greek and Roman architecture shifted focus to civic virtues. Indian and Chinese architecture influenced forms all over Asia, and Buddhist architecture in particular took diverse local flavors. During the Middle Ages, pan-European styles of Romanesque and Gothic cathedrals and abbeys emerged while the Renaissance favored Classical forms implemented by architects known by name. Later, the roles of architects and engineers became separated.

Modern architecture began after World War I as an avant-garde movement that sought to develop a completely new style appropriate for a new post-war social and economic order focused on meeting the needs of the middle and working classes. Emphasis was put on modern techniques, materials, and simplified geometric forms, paving the way for high-rise superstructures. Many architects became disillusioned with modernism, which they perceived as ahistorical and anti-aesthetic, and postmodern and contemporary architecture developed. Over the years, the field of architectural construction has branched out to include everything from ship design to interior decorating.

== Definitions ==
Architecture can mean:

- A general term to describe buildings and other physical structures.
- The art and science of designing buildings and (some) nonbuilding structures; sometimes called "architectonics."
- The style of design and method of construction of buildings and other physical structures.
- A unifying or coherent form or structure.
- The knowledge of art, science, technology, and humanity.
- The design activity of the architect, from the macro-level (urban design, landscape architecture) to the micro-level (construction details and furniture).
- The practice of the architect, where architecture means offering or rendering professional services in connection with the design and construction of buildings or built environments.

== Theory ==
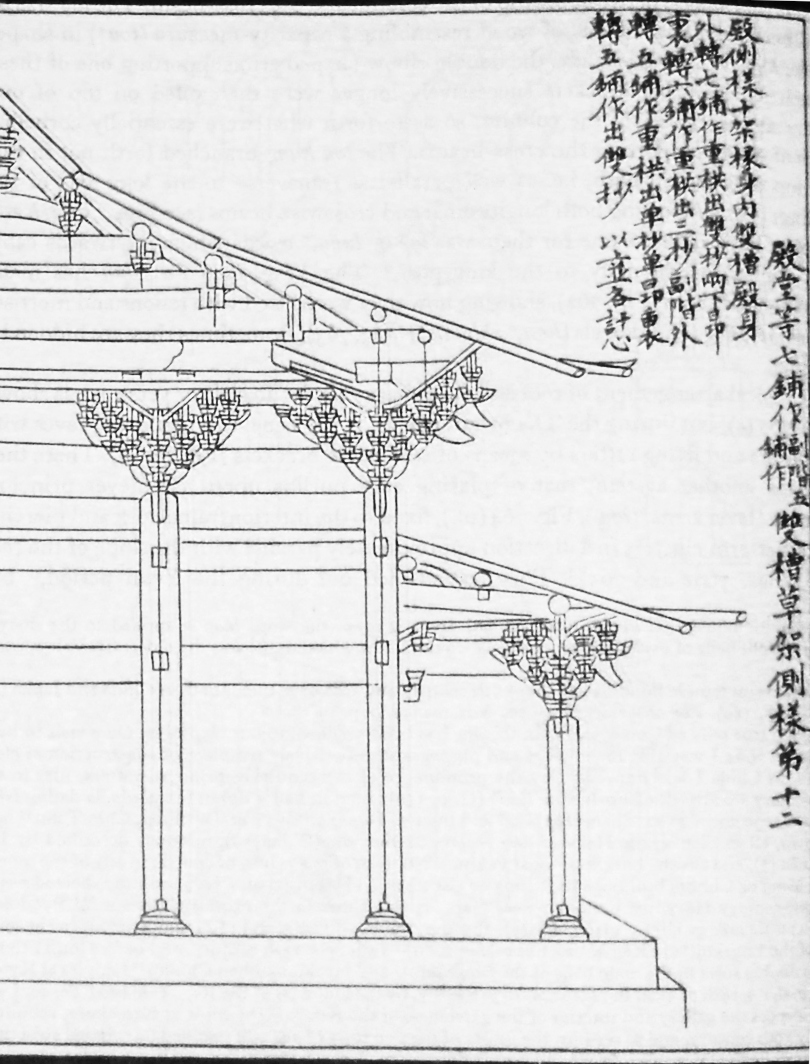
Illustration of bracket arm clusters containing cantilevers from Yingzao Fashi, a text on architecture by Li Jue (1065–1110)

The philosophy of architecture is a branch of the philosophy of art, dealing with the aesthetic value of architecture, its semantics, and its relation to the development of culture. Many philosophers and theoreticians from Plato to Michel Foucault, Gilles Deleuze, Robert Venturi and Ludwig Wittgenstein have concerned themselves with the nature of architecture and whether or not architecture is distinguished from building.

=== Historic treatises ===
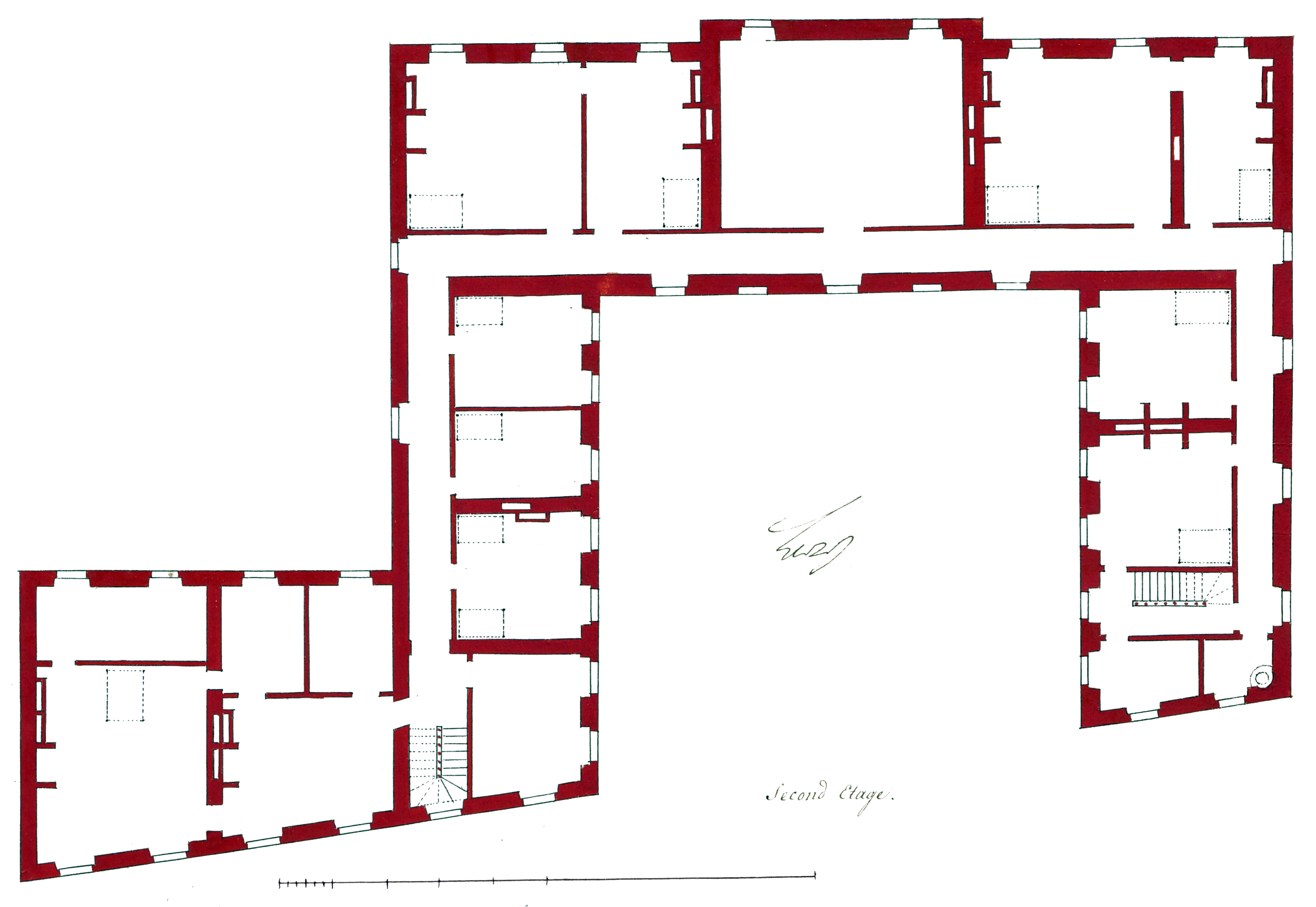
Plan of the second floor (attic storey) of the Hôtel de Brionne in Paris—1734.

The earliest surviving written work on the subject of architecture is De architectura by the Roman architect Vitruvius in the early 1st century BC. According to Vitruvius, a good building should satisfy the three principles of firmitas, utilitas, venustas, commonly known by the original translation—firmness, commodity, and delight. An equivalent in modern English would be:

- Durability—a building should stand up robustly and remain in good condition
- Utility—it should be suitable for the purposes for which it is used
- Beauty—it should be aesthetically pleasing

According to Vitruvius, the architect should strive to fulfill each of these three attributes as well as possible. Leon Battista Alberti, who elaborates on the ideas of Vitruvius in his treatise, De re aedificatoria, saw beauty primarily as a matter of proportion, although ornament also played a part. For Alberti, the rules of proportion were those that governed the idealized human figure, the golden mean. The most important aspect of beauty was, therefore, an inherent part of an object, rather than something applied superficially, and was based on universal, recognizable truths. The notion of style in the arts was not developed until the 16th century, with the writing of Giorgio Vasari. By the 18th century, his Lives of the Most Excellent Painters, Sculptors, and Architects had been translated into Italian, French, Spanish, and English.

In the 16th century, Italian Mannerist architect, painter, and theorist Sebastiano Serlio wrote Tutte L'Opere D'Architettura et Prospetiva (Complete Works on Architecture and Perspective). This treatise exerted immense influence throughout Europe, being the first handbook that emphasized the practical rather than the theoretical aspects of architecture, and it was the first to catalog the five orders.

In the early 19th century, Augustus Welby Northmore Pugin wrote Contrasts (1836) that, as the title suggested, contrasted the modern, industrial world, which he disparaged, with an idealized image of the neo-medieval world. Gothic architecture, Pugin believed, was the only "true Christian form of architecture." The 19th-century English art critic, John Ruskin, in his Seven Lamps of Architecture, published in 1849, was much narrower in his view of what constituted architecture. Architecture was the "art which so disposes and adorns the edifices raised by men ... that the sight of them" contributes "to his mental health, power, and pleasure". For Ruskin, the aesthetic was of overriding significance. His work goes on to state that a building is not truly a work of architecture unless it is in some way "adorned". For Ruskin, a well-constructed, well-proportioned, functional building needed string courses or rustication, at the very least.

On the difference between the ideals of architecture and mere construction, the 20th-century architect Le Corbusier wrote:

You employ stone, wood, and concrete, and with these materials you build houses and palaces: that is construction. Ingenuity is at work. But suddenly you touch my heart, you do me good. I am happy and I say: This is beautiful. That is Architecture.

Le Corbusier's contemporary Ludwig Mies van der Rohe is said to have stated in a 1959 interview that "architecture starts when you carefully put two bricks together. There it begins."

=== Modern concepts ===
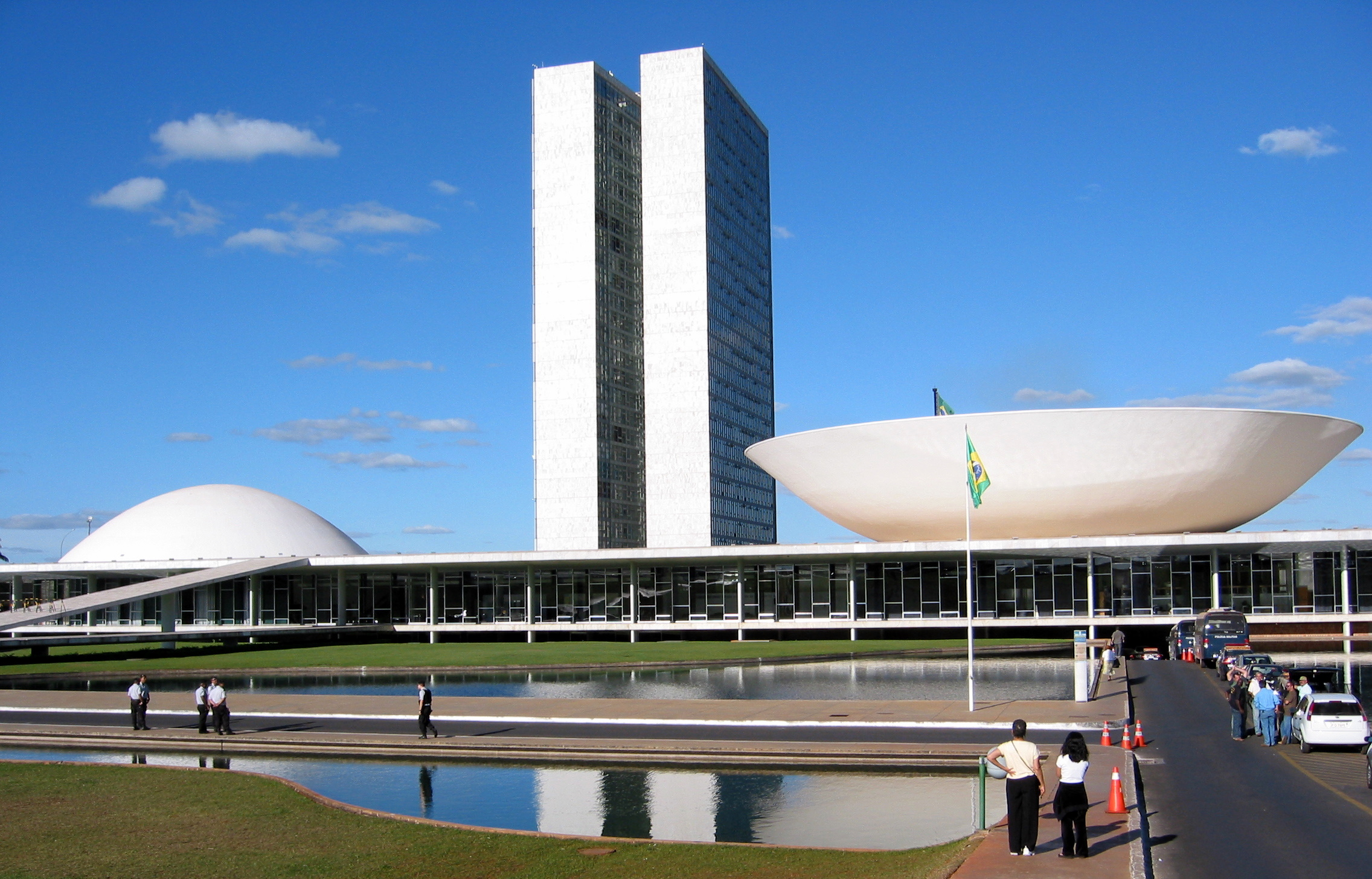
The National Congress of Brazil, designed by Oscar Niemeyer

The notable 19th-century architect of skyscrapers, Louis Sullivan, promoted an overriding precept to architectural design: "Form follows function". While the notion that structural and aesthetic considerations should be entirely subject to functionality was met with both popularity and skepticism, it introduced the concept of "function" in place of Vitruvius' "utility". "Function" came to be seen as encompassing all criteria of the use, perception, and enjoyment of a building—not only practical but also aesthetic, psychological, and cultural.

Nunzia Rondanini stated:

Through its aesthetic dimension architecture goes beyond the functional aspects that it has in common with other human sciences. Through its own particular way of expressing values, architecture can stimulate and influence social life without presuming that, in and of itself, it will promote social development.... To restrict the meaning of (architectural) formalism to art for art's sake is not only reactionary; it can also be a purposeless quest for perfection or originality which degrades form into a mere instrumentality.

The aesthetics of architecture remain a contested topic. Differences in aesthetic preferences between architects and the public were found. Studies generally find that there is a strong public preference for traditional and classical architectural styles over modernist designs. James Stevens Curl argues that modernist architects often favour designs that are alienating and environmentally damaging. Léon Krier frames the dominance of traditional styles in private architecture as an "overwhelming democratic reality," contrasting with the prevalence of modernist designs in public commissions.

Among the philosophies that have influenced modern architects and their approach to building design are Rationalism, Empiricism, Structuralism, Poststructuralism, Deconstruction, and Phenomenology.

In the late 20th century, a new concept was added to those included in the compass of both structure and function: the consideration of sustainability, hence sustainable architecture. To satisfy the contemporary ethos, a building should be constructed in a manner that is environmentally friendly in terms of the production of its materials, its impact upon the natural and built environment of its surrounding area, and the demands that it makes upon the natural environment for heating, ventilation and cooling, water use, waste products and lighting.

== History ==
=== Origins and vernacular architecture ===
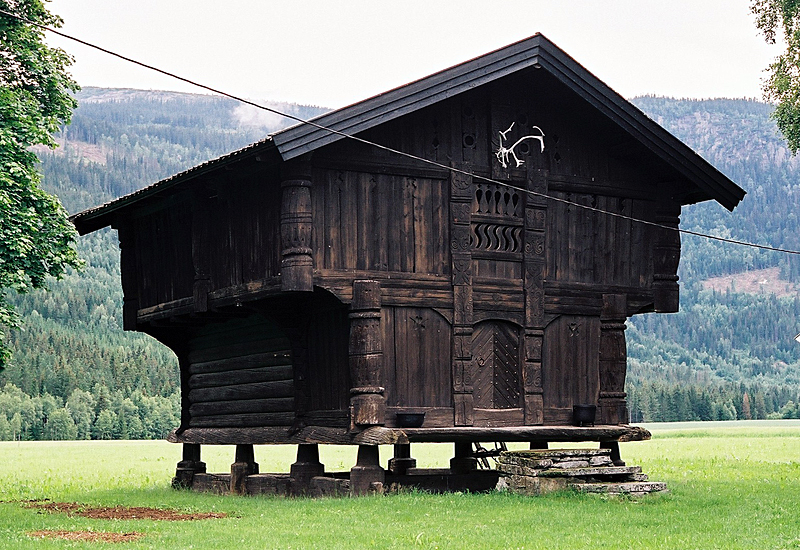
A wooden vernacular house in Norway

Building first evolved out of the dynamics between needs (e.g. shelter, security, and worship) and means (available building materials and attendant skills). As human cultures developed and knowledge began to be formalized through oral traditions and practices, building became a craft, and architecture became the term used to describe the highly formalized and respected aspects of the craft. It is widely assumed that architectural success was achieved through trial and error, with progressively less trial and more replication as results became satisfactory over time. However, vernacular architecture, in essence a rudimentary, non-academic form of building construction based on cultural traditions, continues to be produced in many parts of the world.

=== Prehistoric architecture ===
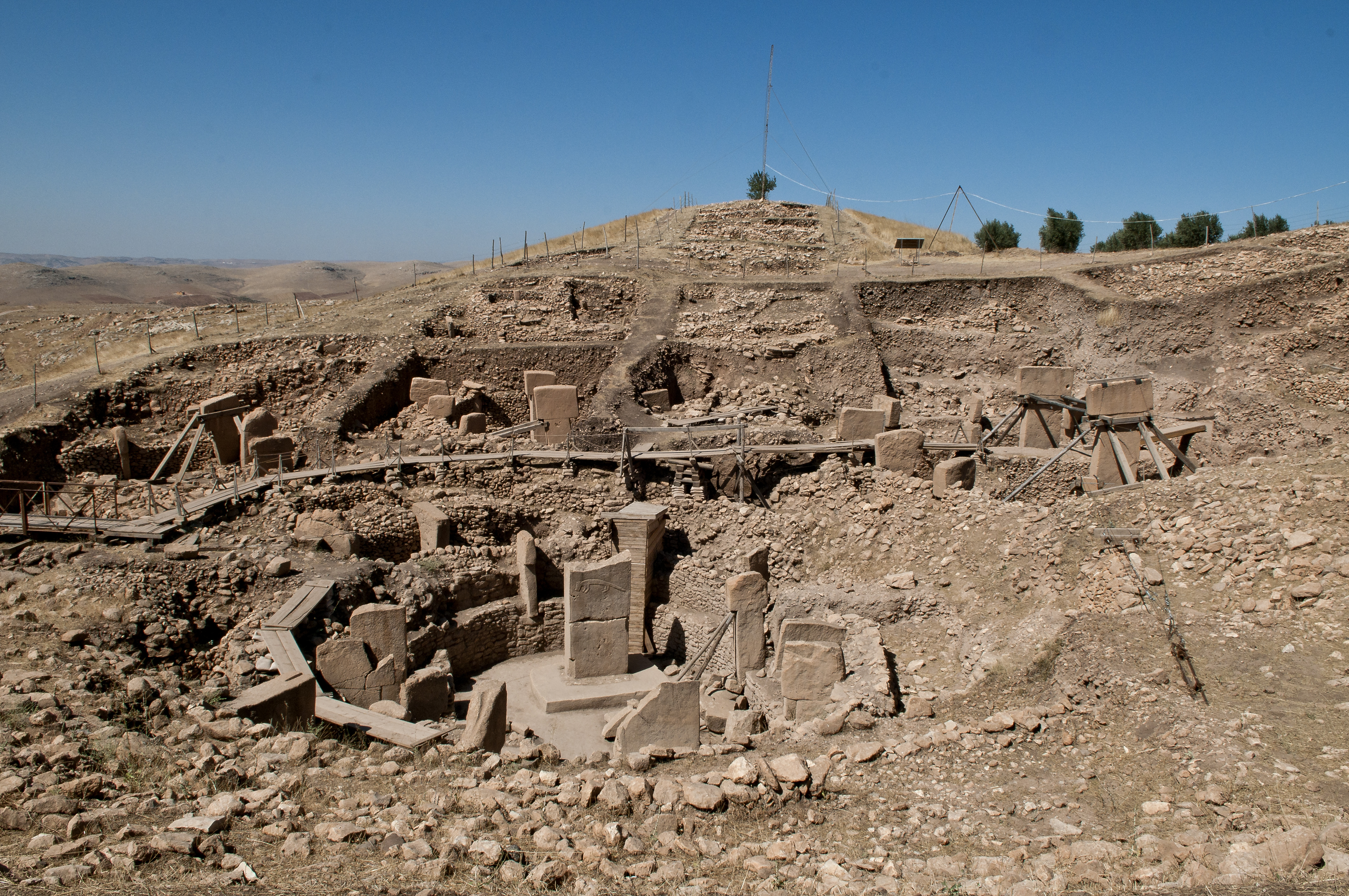
The Göbekli Tepe in Turkey, 10th to 8th millennium BC

Early human settlements were mostly rural. Expanding economies resulted in the creation of proto-cities or urban areas, which in some cases grew and evolved very rapidly, such as Çatalhöyük in modern-day Turkey and Mohenjo-daro in modern-day Pakistan.

Neolithic archaeological sites include Göbekli Tepe and Çatalhöyük in Turkey, Jericho in the Levant, Mehrgarh in Pakistan, Skara Brae in Orkney, and Cucuteni-Trypillian culture settlements in Romania, Moldova and Ukraine.

=== Classical era ===
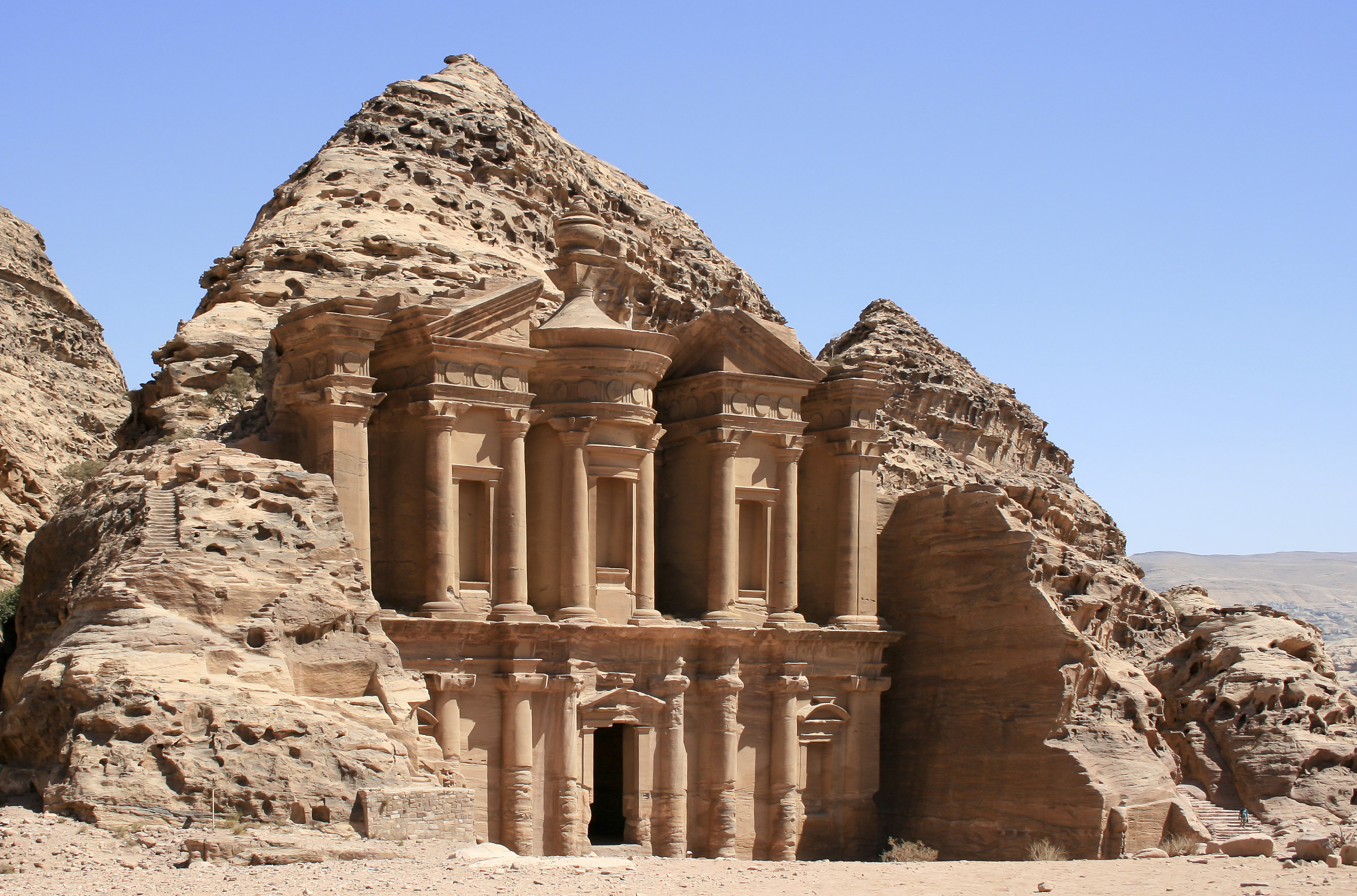
Ed-Deir "The Monastery" at Petra, Jordan, c. mid-first century AD

In many ancient civilizations, such as those of Egypt and Mesopotamia, architecture and urbanism reflected the constant engagement with the divine and the supernatural, and many ancient cultures resorted to monumentality in their architecture to symbolically represent the political power of the ruler or the state itself. In Egypt, the education of state architects was closely linked to the priestly class, and trade secrets were passed from father to son. Plans were drawn and then implemented using the ruler, square, and triangle.

The architecture and urbanism of classical civilizations such as the Greek and Roman civilizations evolved from civic ideals rather than religious or empirical ones. New building types emerged and architectural style developed in the form of the classical orders. Roman architecture was influenced by Greek architecture as they incorporated many Greek elements into their building practices.

Texts on architecture have been written since ancient times—these texts provided both general advice and specific formal prescriptions or canons. Some examples of canons are found in the writings of Vitruvius in the 1st century BC. Some of the most important early examples of canonic architecture are religious.

=== Asian architecture ===
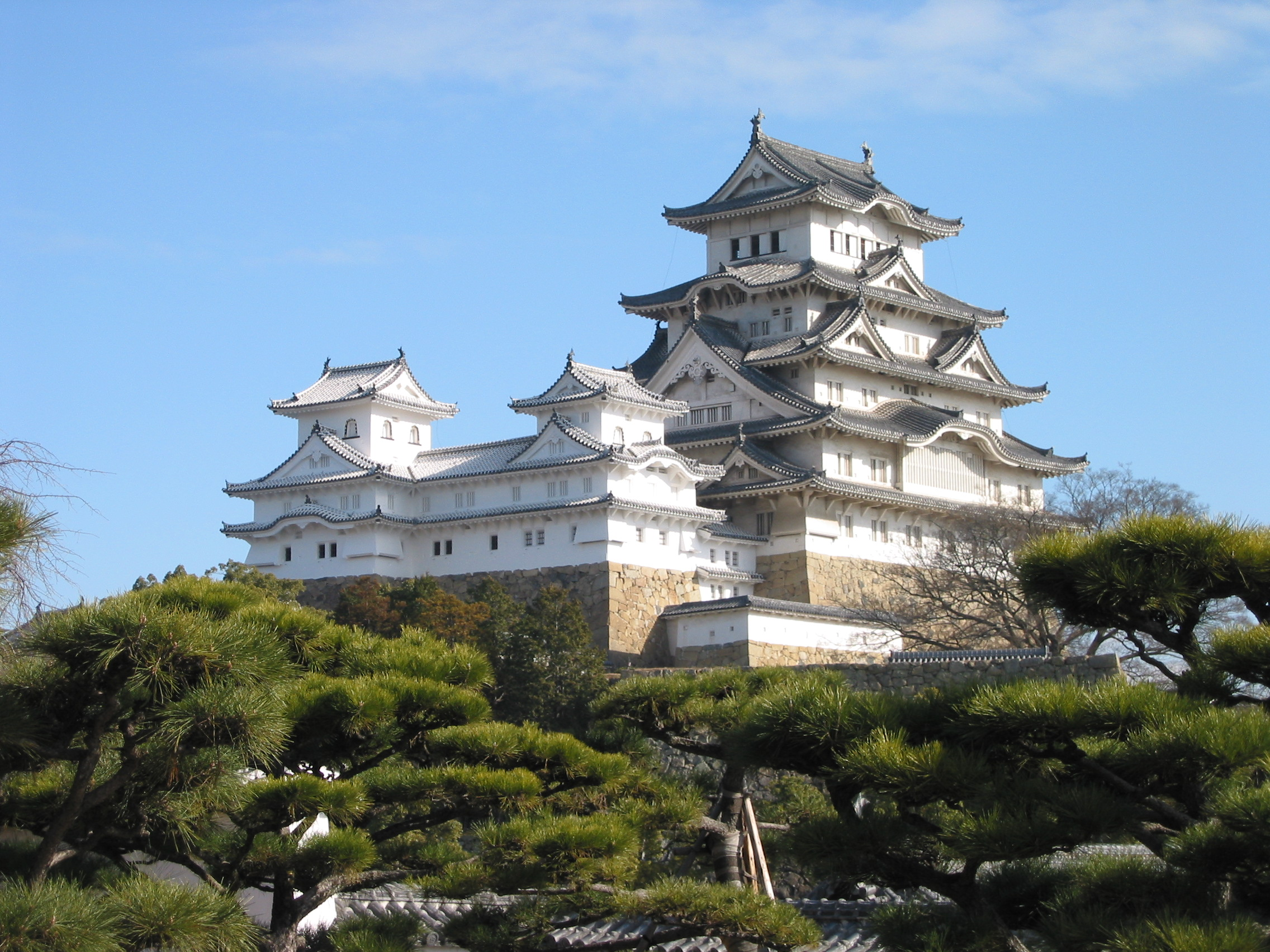
Himeji Castle, Japan, 1609

Asian architecture developed differently from European architecture, and the Buddhist, Hindu, and Sikh architectural styles have different characteristics. Unlike Indian and Chinese architecture, which had great influence on the surrounding regions, Japanese architecture did not. Some Asian architecture showed great regional diversity, in particular Buddhist architecture. Moreover, another architectural achievement in Asia is the Hindu temple architecture, which developed from around the 5th century CE. It is, in theory, governed by concepts laid down in the Shastras, and is concerned with expressing both the macrocosm and the microcosm.

In many Asian countries, pantheistic religion led to architectural forms that were designed specifically to enhance the natural landscape. Also, the grandest houses were relatively lightweight structures mainly using wood until recent times, and there are few survivals of great age. Buddhism was associated with a move to stone and brick religious structures, probably beginning as rock-cut architecture, which has often survived very well.

Early Asian writings on architecture include the Kao Gong Ji of China from the 7th–5th centuries BC, the Shilpa Shastras of ancient India, Manjusri Vasthu Vidya Sastra of Sri Lanka, and Araniko of Nepal.

=== African Architecture ===
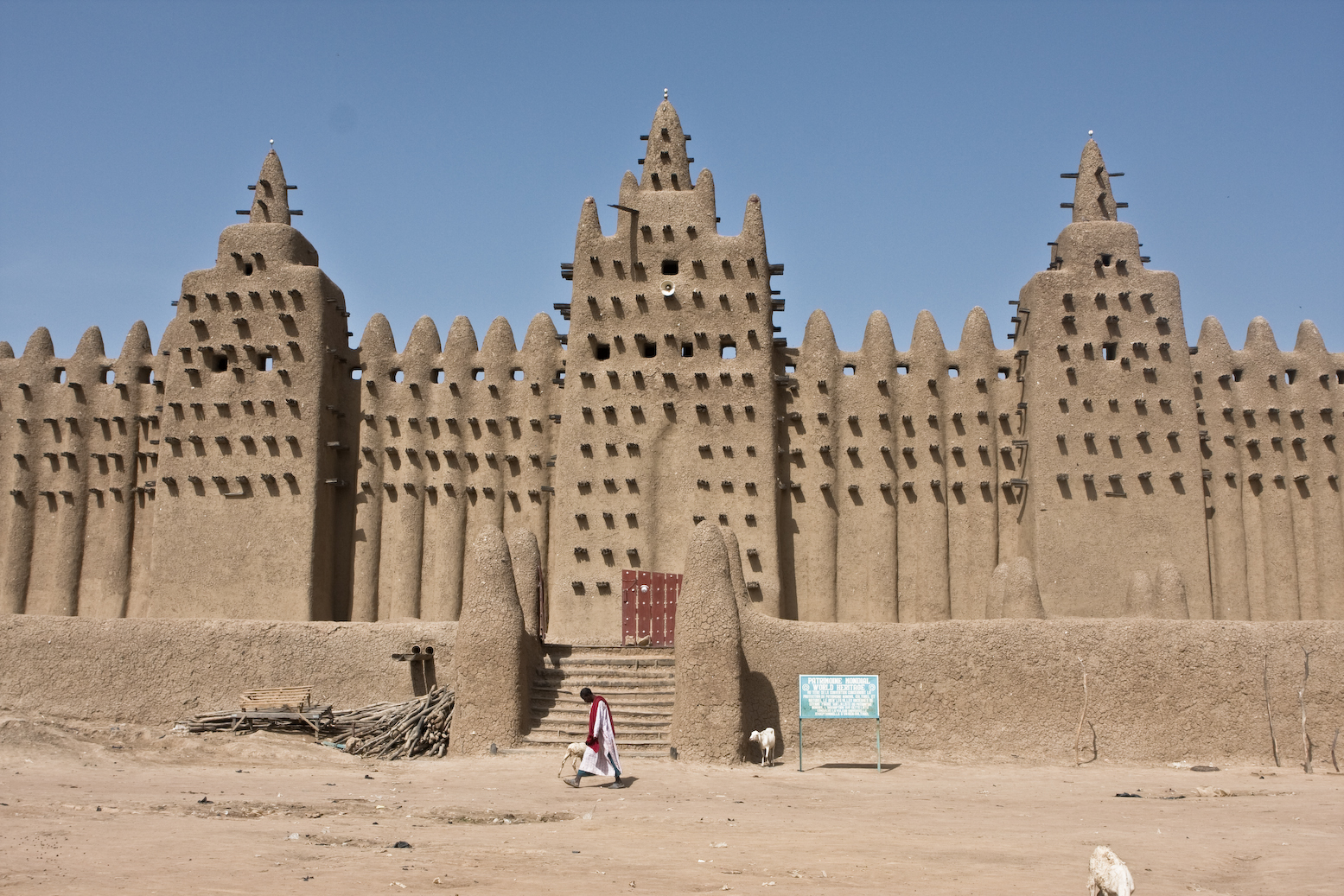
The Great Mosque of Djenné in Mali, 13th–14th century, reconstructed in 1906

The Architecture of Africa is very diverse, reflecting the continent's many climates, cultures, and histories. Traditional African architecture mixes building traditions, using a wide range of materials like mud, stone, and wood. Fractal scaling is commonly used in designs, making smaller parts of a structure mirror the overall design. This concept can be seen in village layouts and decorative elements.

Historical stone structures like the Great Zimbabwe walls show long-lasting and durable construction. Wattle and daub is a technique used in many areas that uses wooden frames covered in mud to create rounded structures that help to regulate the temperature inside. Architecture in West Africa—such as Porto-Novo in Benin, Lagos Island and Zaria in Nigeria, and Dakar in Senegal—is dominated by the Sudano-Sahelian, Afro-modernist designs and Sobrado styles. This is a form of multi-storied, Portuguese-Brazilian baroque architecture.

These buildings are suited for dry, hot climates, as they often have central or rear courtyards, stuccoed façades, symmetrical layouts, tiled roofs for heat insulation, and prominent balconies. Along the Swahili Coast of East Africa, many homes are made out of coral stone with mangrove pole roofs. The architecture is a mix of local, Arabic, and Islamic styles due to trade across the Indian Ocean. Ethiopia also has stunning architectural traditions like the rock-hewn churches such as the 13th-century churches of Lalibela, which were carved directly into the ground. Together, these styles highlight the creativity, adaptability, and cultural depth of African architectural traditions.

=== Islamic architecture ===
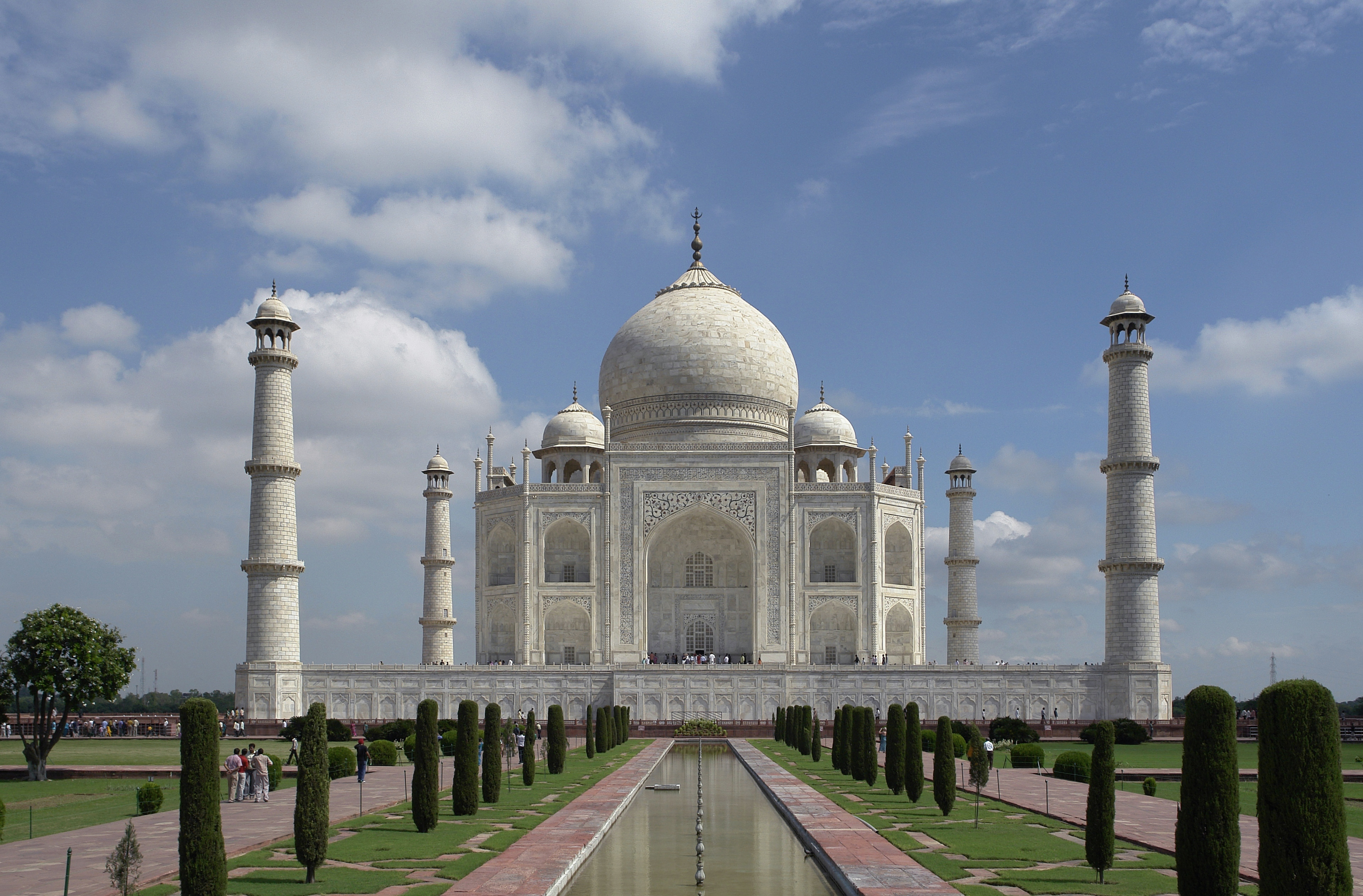
The Taj Mahal in India, 17th century

Islamic architecture began in the 7th century, incorporating architectural forms from the ancient Middle East and Byzantium, but also developing features to suit the religious and social needs of the society. Examples can be found throughout the Middle East, Africa, the Iberian Peninsula, the Mediterranean islands, the Indian Sub-continent, and later in eastern parts of Europe, such as the Balkan States, as a result of the expansion of the Ottoman Empire.

=== European medieval architecture ===
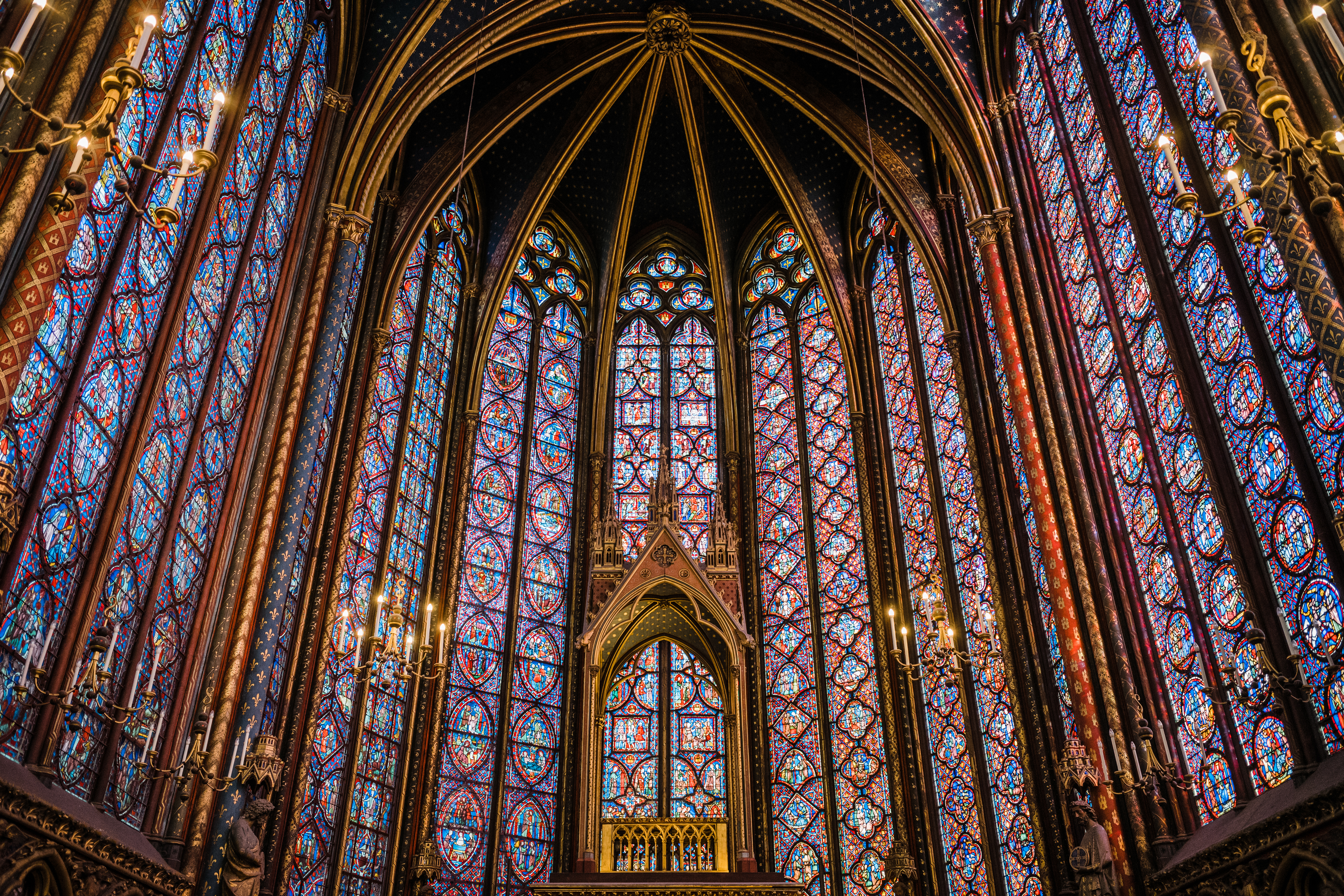
Stained glass windows at the Sainte-Chapelle in Paris, 1248

In Europe during the Medieval period, guilds were formed by craftsmen to organize their trades, and written contracts have survived, particularly in relation to ecclesiastical buildings. The role of architect was usually one with that of master mason, or Magister lathomorum as they are sometimes described in contemporary documents.

The major architectural undertakings were the building of abbeys and cathedrals. From about 900 onward, the movements of both clerics and tradesmen carried architectural knowledge across Europe, resulting in the pan-European styles Romanesque and Gothic.

A significant part of the Middle Ages' architectural heritage is numerous fortifications across the continent. From the Balkans to Spain, and from Malta to Estonia, these buildings represent an important part of European heritage.

=== Renaissance architecture ===
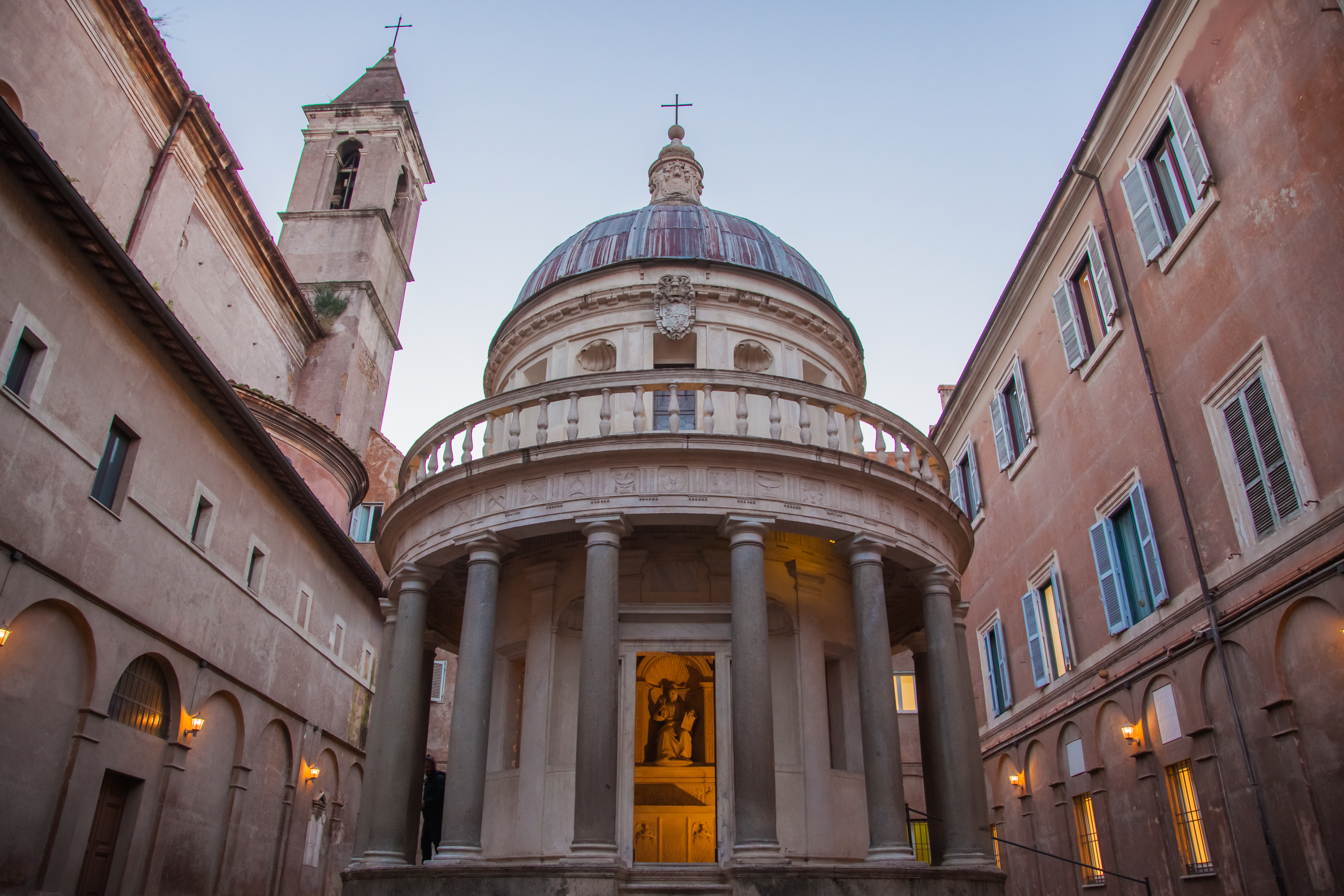
The Tempietto in Rome, 1444–1514

In Renaissance Europe, from about 1400 onwards, there was a revival of Classical learning accompanied by the development of Renaissance humanism, which placed greater emphasis on the role of the individual in society than had been the case during the Medieval period. Buildings were ascribed to specific architects—Brunelleschi, Alberti, Michelangelo, Palladio—and the cult of the individual had begun. There was still no dividing line between artist, architect, engineer, or any of the related vocations, and the appellation was often one of regional preference.

A revival of the Classical style in architecture was accompanied by a burgeoning of science and engineering, which affected the proportions and structure of buildings. At this stage, it was still possible for an artist to design a bridge as the level of structural calculations involved was within the scope of the generalist.

=== Early modern and the industrial age ===
With the emerging knowledge in scientific fields and the rise of new materials and technology, architecture and engineering began to separate, and the architect began to concentrate on aesthetics and the humanist aspects, often at the expense of technical aspects of building design. There was also the rise of the "gentleman architect" who usually dealt with wealthy clients and concentrated predominantly on visual qualities derived usually from historical prototypes, typified by the many country houses of Great Britain that were created in the Neo-Gothic or Scottish baronial styles. Formal architectural training in the 19th century, for example, at École des Beaux-Arts in France, gave much emphasis to the production of beautiful drawings and little to context and feasibility.

Meanwhile, the Industrial Revolution laid open the door for mass production and consumption. Aesthetics became a criterion for the middle class as ornamented products, once within the province of expensive craftsmanship, became cheaper under machine production.

Vernacular architecture became increasingly ornamental. Housebuilders could use current architectural design in their work by combining features found in pattern books and architectural journals.

=== Modernism ===
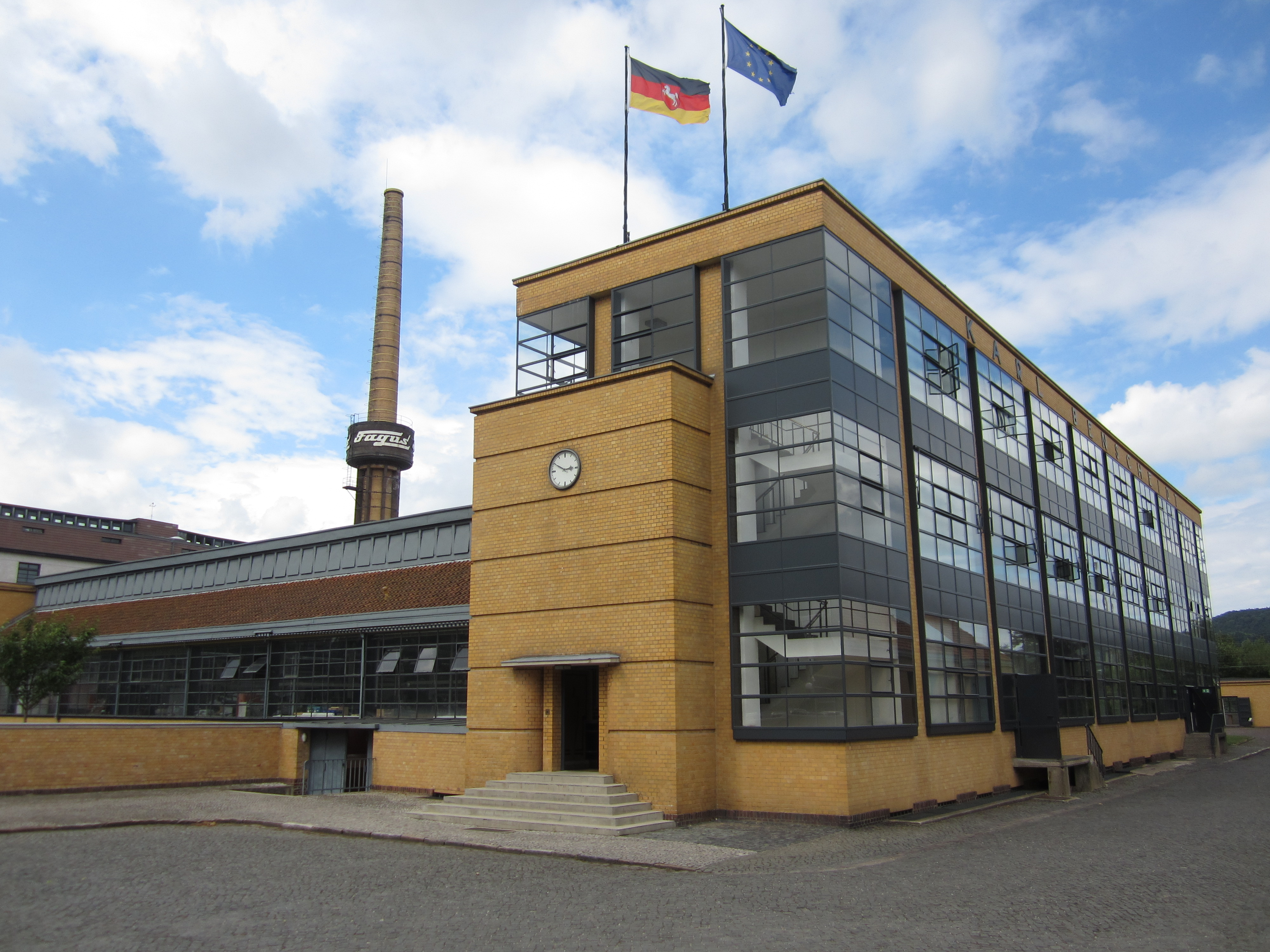
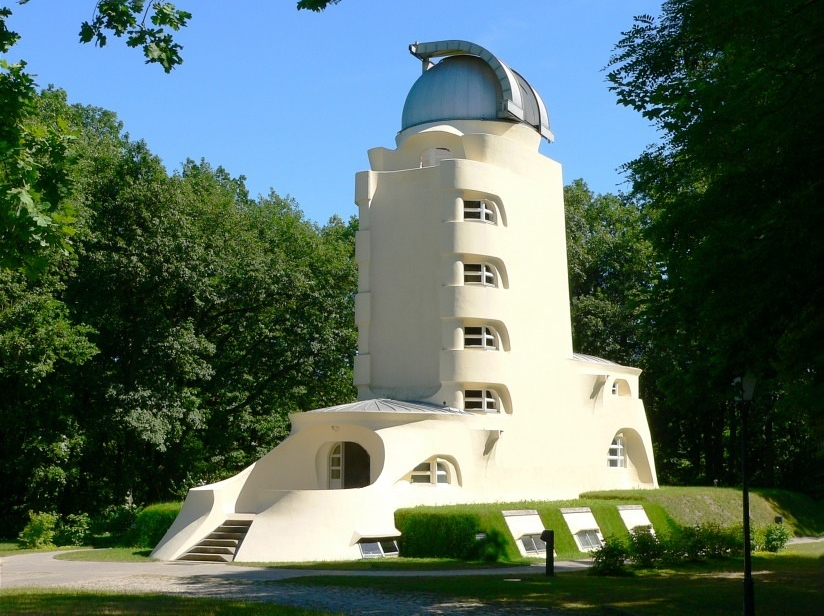
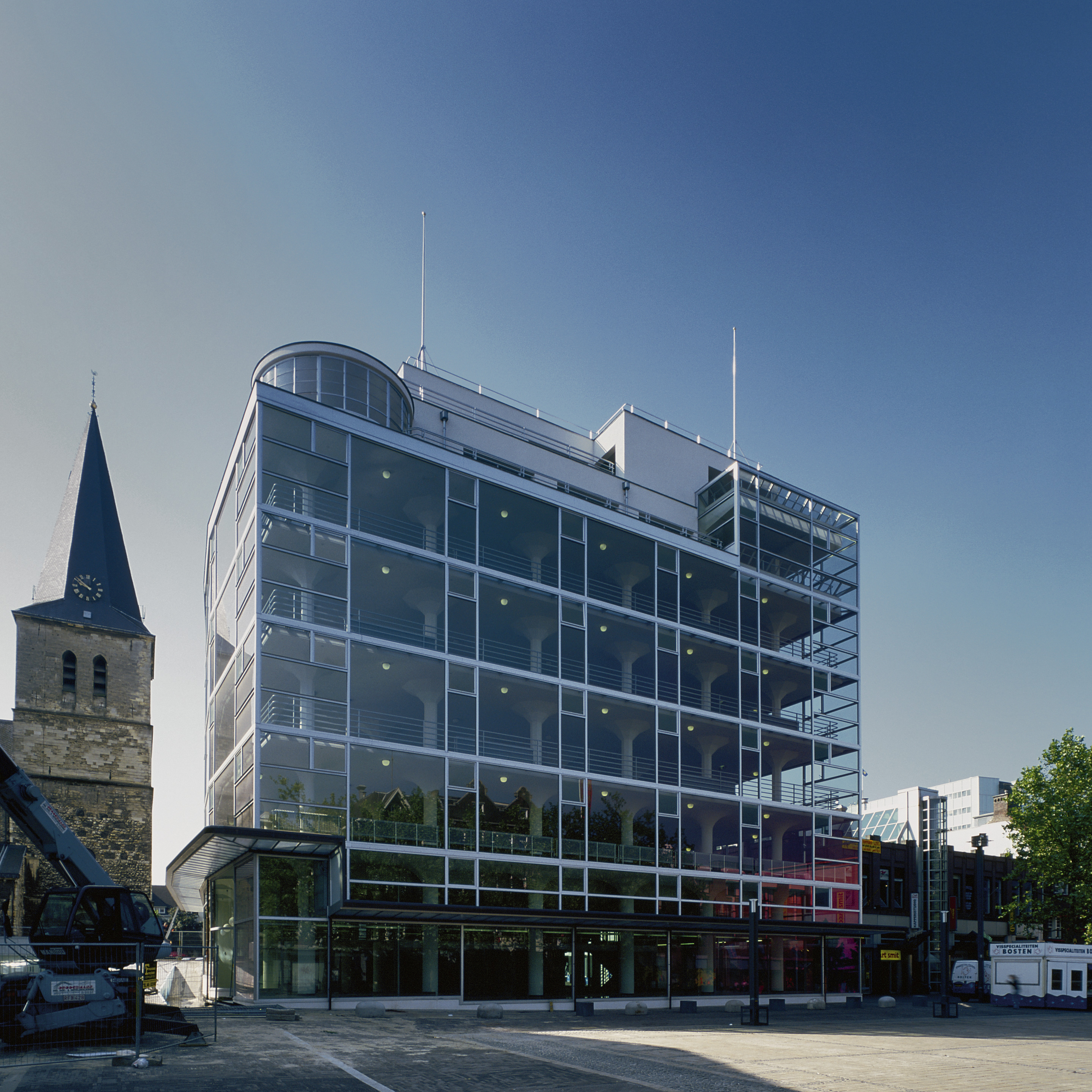
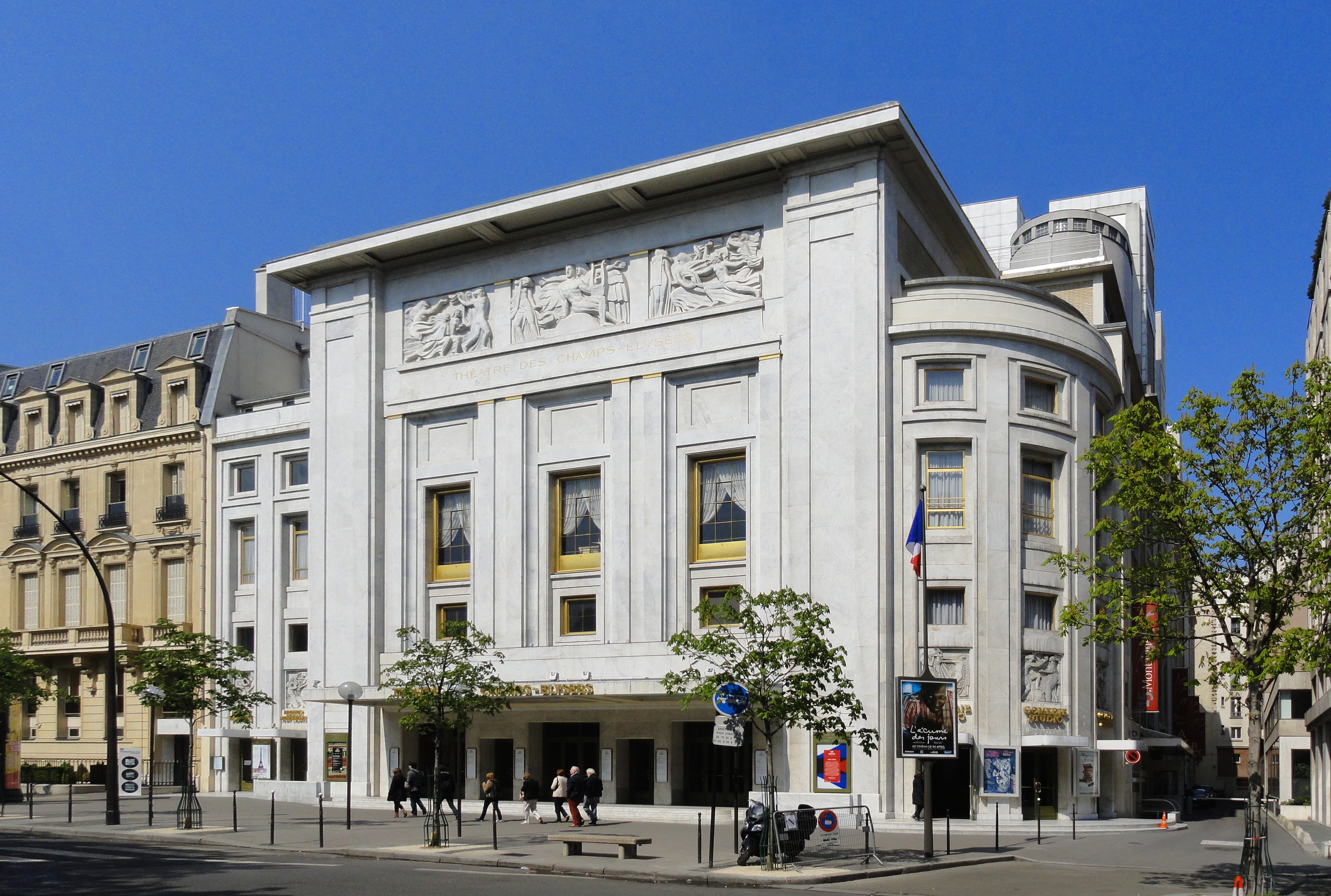
Clockwise from upper left: Fagus Factory, Alfeld, Germany, 1911; Einstein Tower, Potsdam, Germany, 1919–22; Derzhprom, Kharkiv, Ukraine, 1925–28; Théâtre des Champs-Élysées, Paris, 1910–13; Glaspaleis, Heerlen, the Netherlands, 1934–35

Around the beginning of the 20th century, general dissatisfaction with the emphasis on revivalist architecture and elaborate decoration gave rise to many new lines of thought that served as precursors to Modern architecture. Notable among these is the Deutscher Werkbund, formed in 1907 to produce better quality machine-made objects. The rise of the profession of industrial design is usually placed here. Following this lead, the Bauhaus school, founded in Weimar, Germany, in 1919, redefined the architectural bounds previously set throughout history, viewing the creation of a building as the ultimate synthesis – the apex – of art, craft, and technology.

When modern architecture was first practiced, it was an avant-garde movement with moral, philosophical, and aesthetic underpinnings. Immediately after World War I, pioneering modernist architects sought to develop a completely new style appropriate for a new post-war social and economic order focused on meeting the needs of the middle and working classes. They rejected the architectural practice of the academic refinement of historical styles, which served the rapidly declining aristocratic order. The approach of the Modernist architects was to reduce buildings to pure forms, removing historical references and ornament in favor of functional details. Buildings displayed their functional and structural elements, exposing steel beams and concrete surfaces instead of hiding them behind decorative forms. Architects such as Frank Lloyd Wright developed organic architecture, in which the form was defined by its environment and purpose, with an aim to promote harmony between human habitation and the natural world, with prime examples being Robie House and Fallingwater.

Architects such as Mies van der Rohe, Philip Johnson, and Marcel Breuer worked to create beauty based on the inherent qualities of building materials and modern construction techniques, trading traditional historic forms for simplified geometric forms, celebrating the new means and methods made possible by the Industrial Revolution, including steel-frame construction, which gave birth to high-rise superstructures. Fazlur Rahman Khan's development of the tube structure was a technological breakthrough in building ever higher. By mid-century, Modernism had morphed into the International Style, an aesthetic epitomized in many ways by the Twin Towers of New York's World Trade Center designed by Minoru Yamasaki.

=== Postmodernism ===
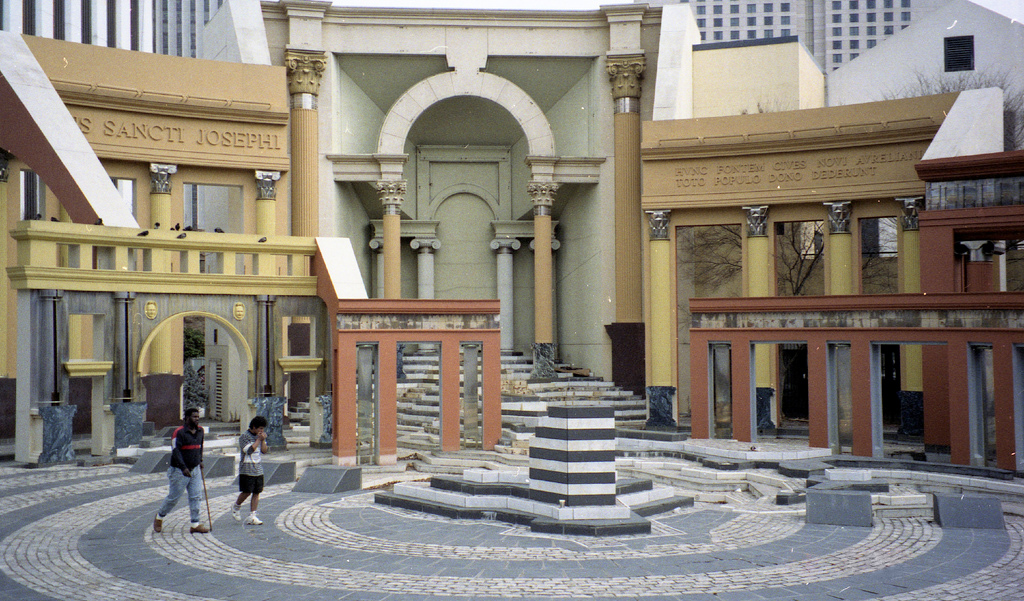
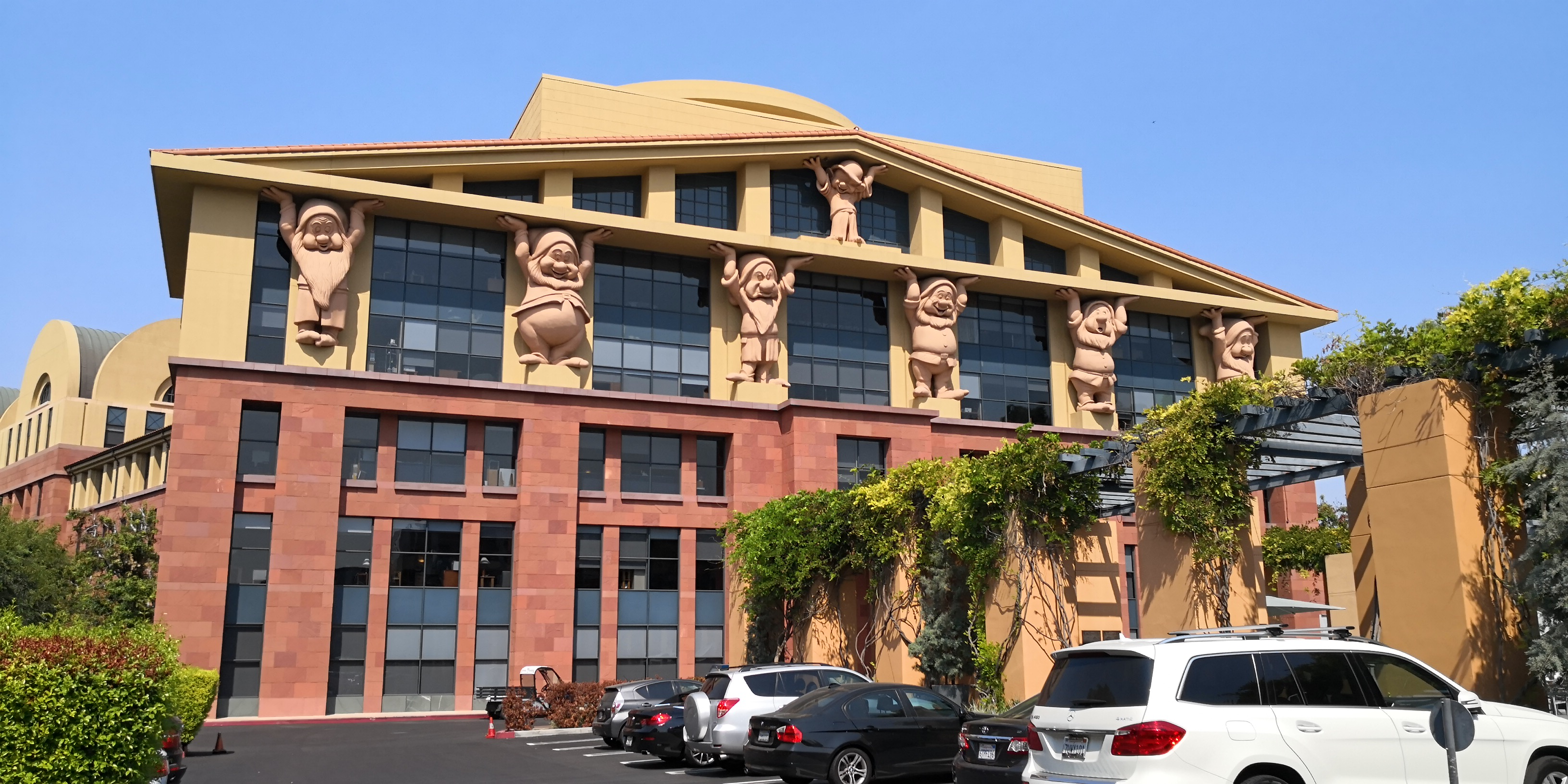
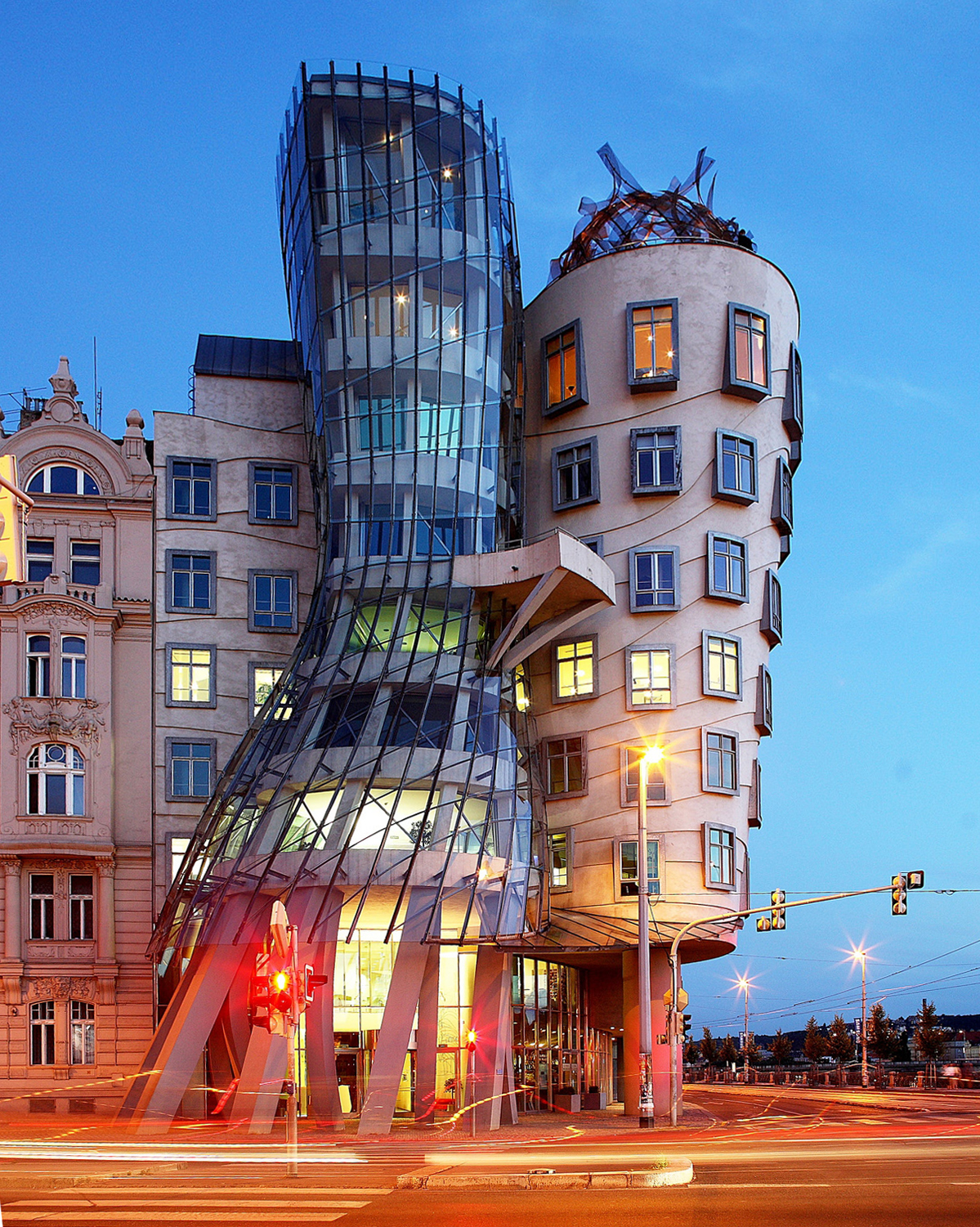
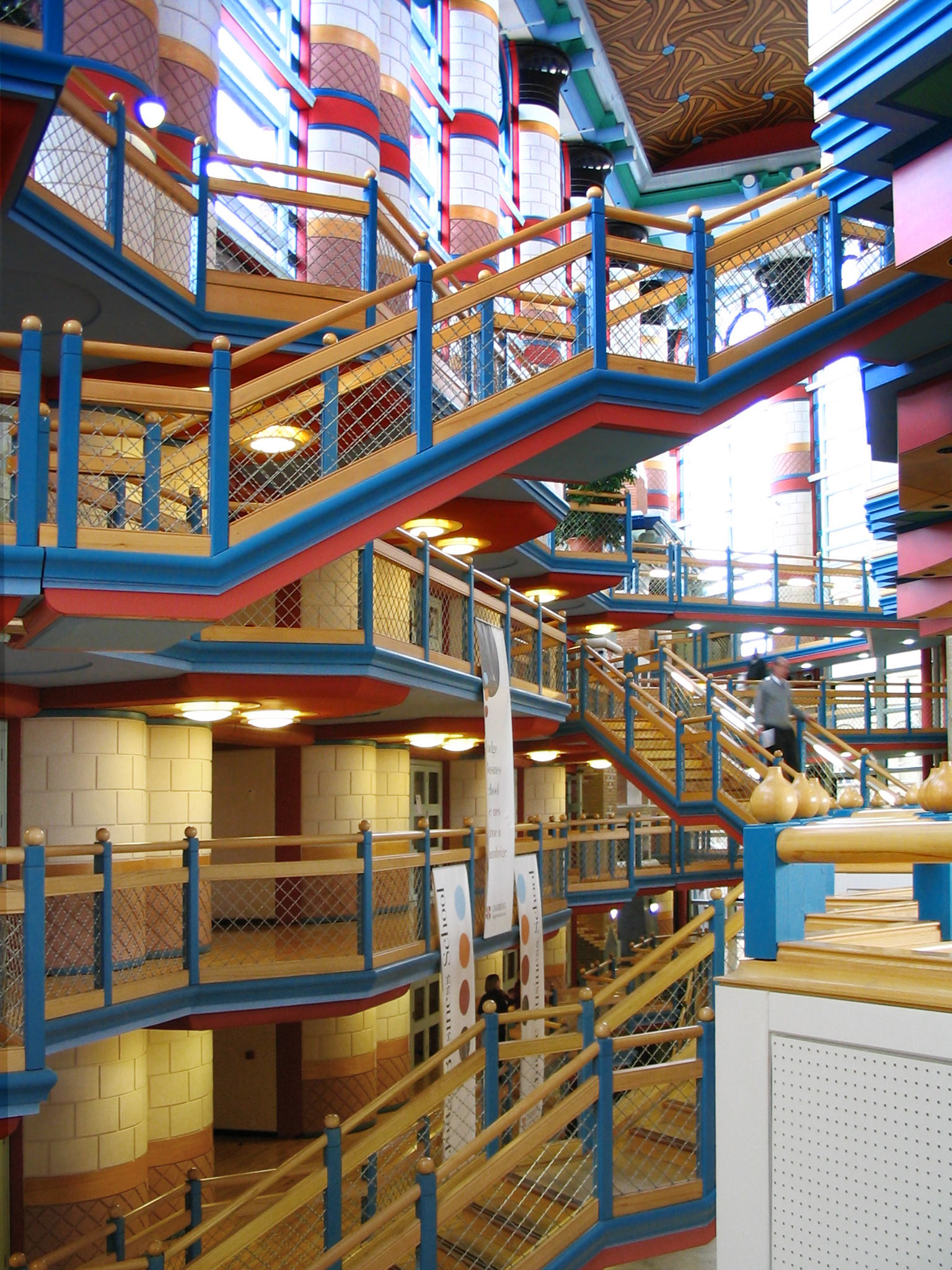
Clockwise from upper left: Piazza d'Italia, New Orleans, US, 1978; Team Disney Building, Los Angeles, US, 1990; interior, Cambridge Judge Business School, Cambridge, UK, 1995; Dancing House, Prague, Czech Republic, 1996

Many architects resisted modernism, finding it devoid of the decorative richness of historical styles. As the first generation of modernists began to die after World War II, the second generation of architects—including Paul Rudolph, Marcel Breuer, and Eero Saarinen—tried to expand the aesthetics of modernism with Brutalism, buildings with expressive sculptural façades made of unfinished concrete. But an even younger postwar generation critiqued modernism and Brutalism for being too austere, standardized, monotone, and not taking into account the richness of human experience offered in historical buildings across time and in different places and cultures.

One such reaction to the cold aesthetic of modernism and Brutalism is the school of metaphoric architecture, which includes such things as biomorphism and zoomorphic architecture, both using nature as the primary source of inspiration and design. While it is considered by some to be merely an aspect of postmodernism, others consider it to be a school in its own right and a later development of expressionist architecture.

Beginning in the late 1950s and 1960s, architectural phenomenology emerged as an important movement in the early reaction against modernism, with architects like Charles Moore in the United States, Christian Norberg-Schulz in Norway, and Ernesto Nathan Rogers, Vittorio Gregotti, Michele Valori, and Bruno Zevi in Italy, who collectively popularized an interest in a new contemporary architecture aimed at expanding human experience using historical buildings as models and precedents. Postmodernism produced a style that combined contemporary building technology and cheap materials with the aesthetics of older pre-modern and non-modern styles, from high classical architecture to popular or vernacular regional building styles. Robert Venturi famously defined postmodern architecture as a "decorated shed" (an ordinary building which is functionally designed inside and embellished on the outside) and upheld it against modernist and brutalist "ducks" (buildings with unnecessarily expressive tectonic forms).

=== Architecture today ===
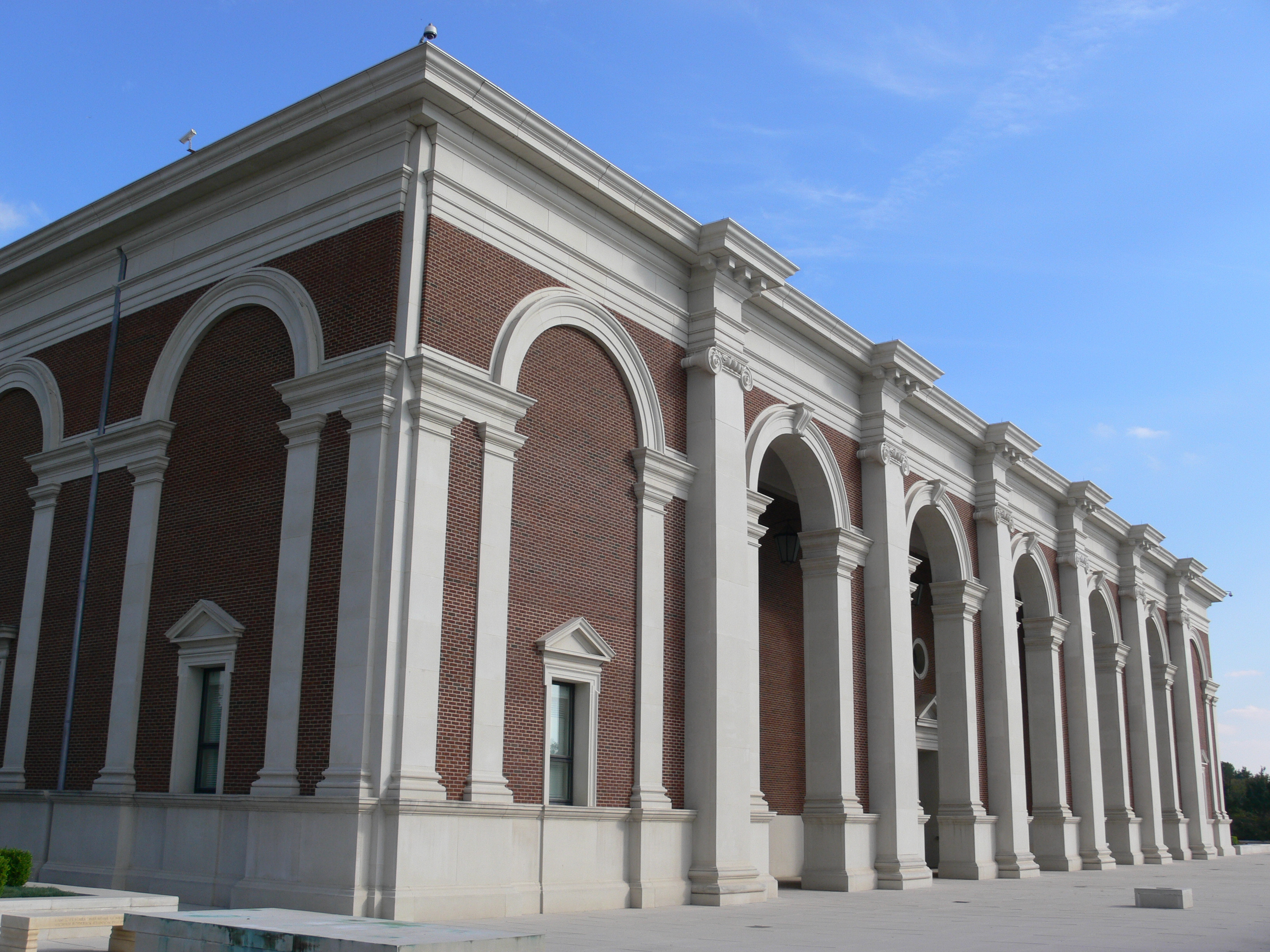
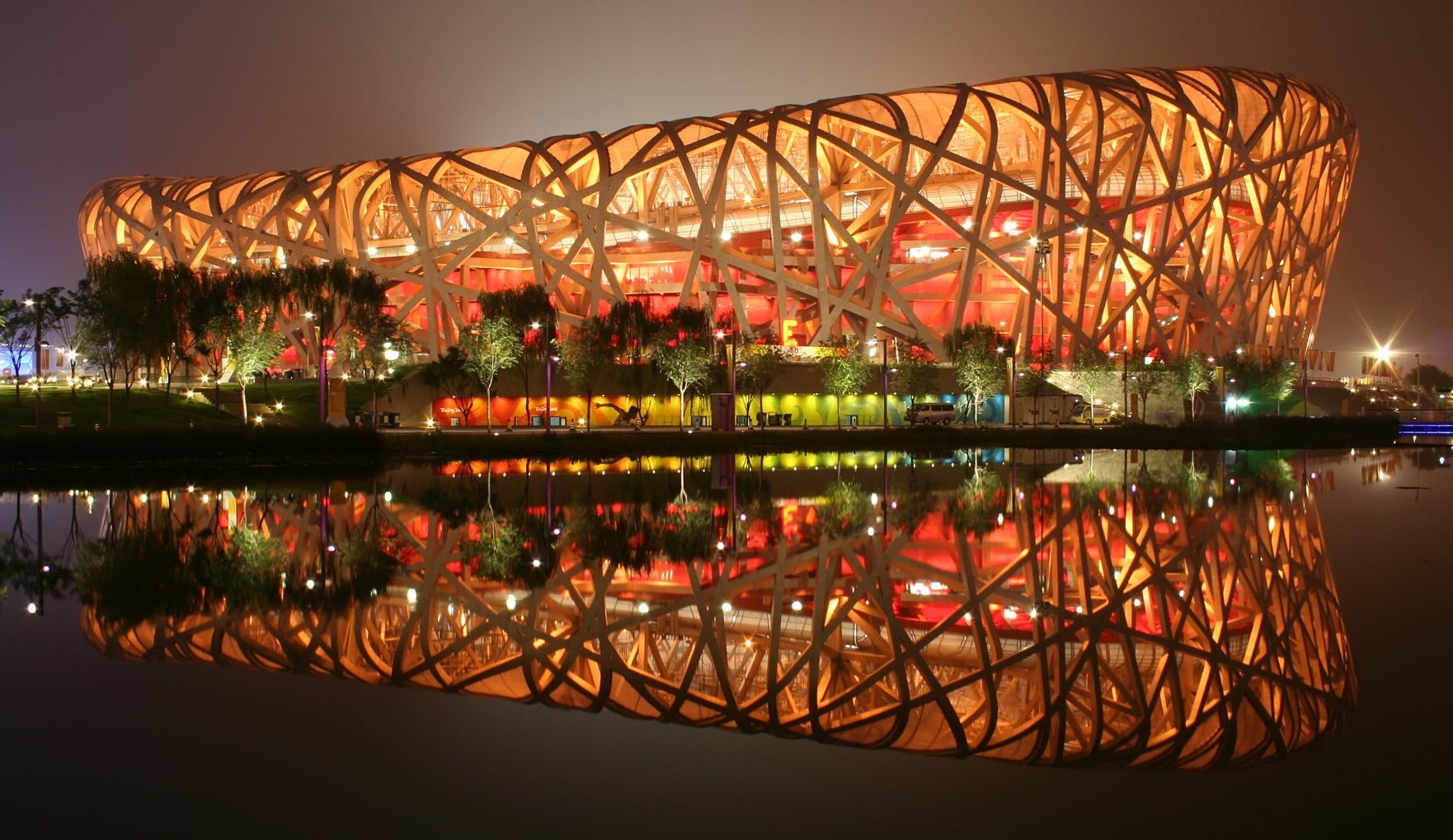
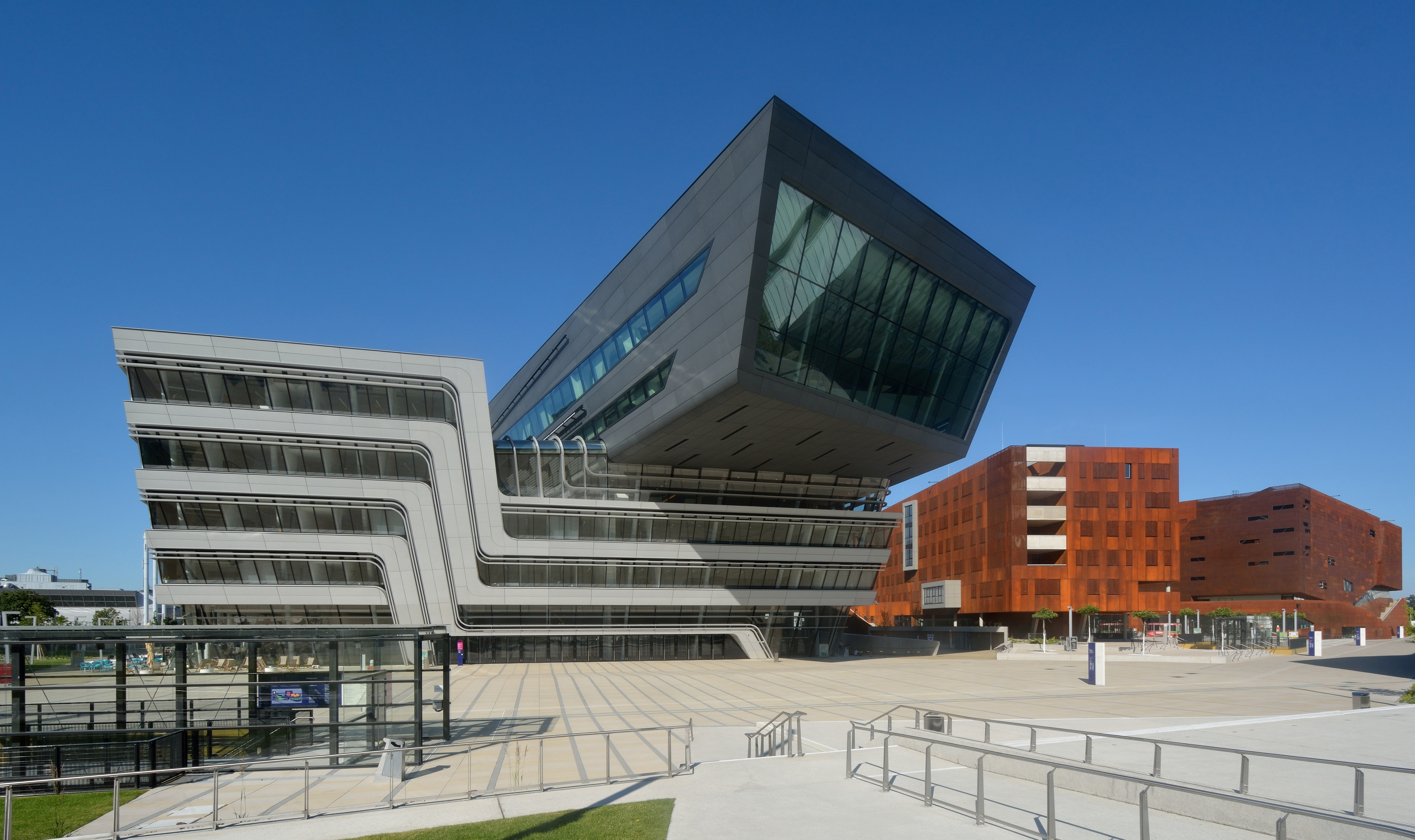
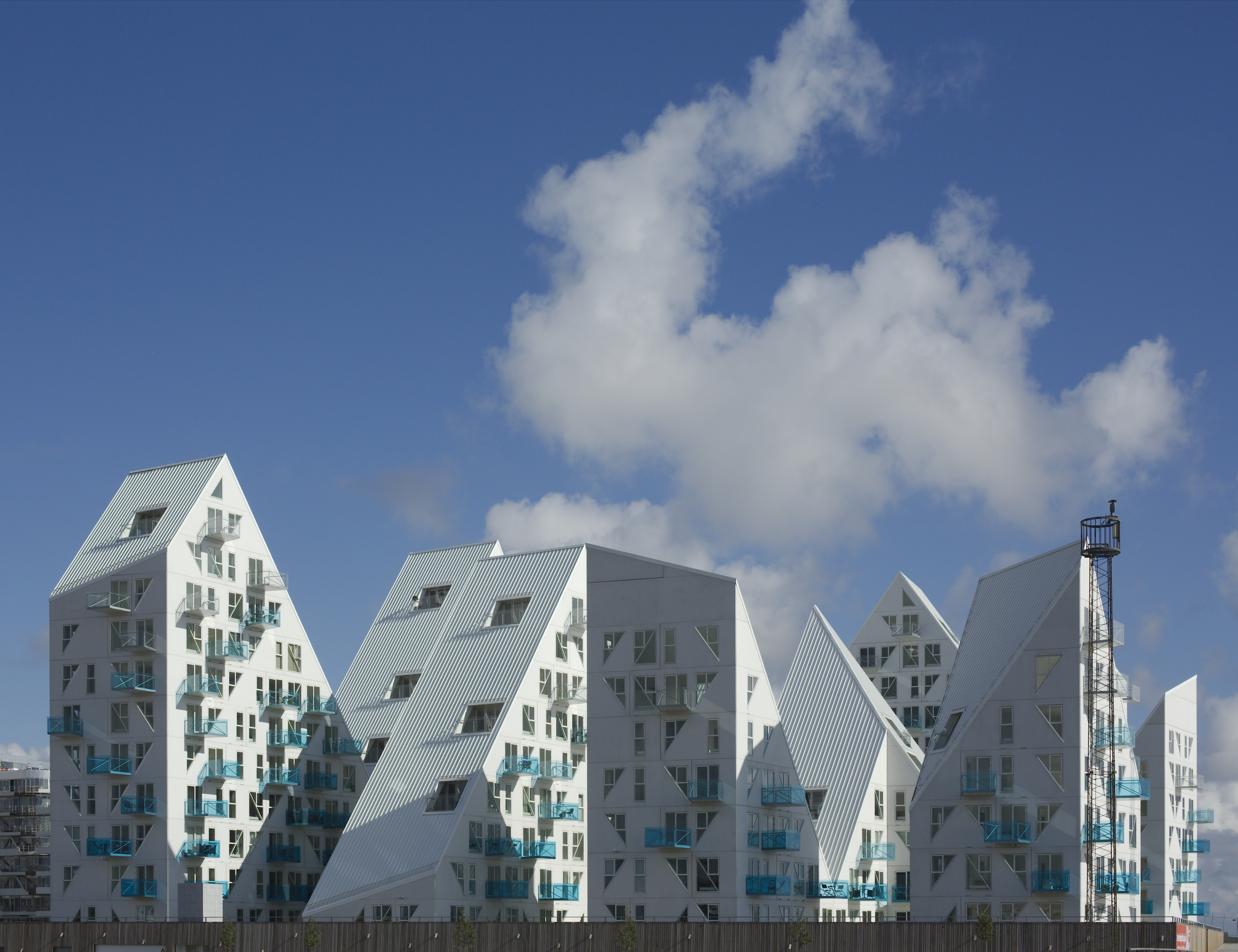
Clockwise from upper left: Meadows Museum Dallas, US; Beijing National Stadium, China, 2003–2007; Isbjerget housing project, Denmark, 2013; Library and Learning Center, University of Vienna, Austria, 2008

Since the 1980s, as the complexity of buildings began to increase (in terms of structural systems, services, energy and technologies), the field of architecture became multi-disciplinary with specializations for each project type, technological expertise or project delivery methods. Moreover, there has been an increased separation of the 'design' architect (Note: A design architect is one who is responsible for the design.) from the 'project' architect who ensures that the project meets the required standards and deals with matters of liability. (Note: A project architect is one who is responsible for ensuring the design is built correctly and who administers building contracts – in non-specialist architectural practices the project architect is also the design architect and the term refers to the differing roles the architect plays at differing stages of the process.) The preparatory processes for the design of any large building have become increasingly complicated, and they require preliminary studies of such matters as durability, sustainability, quality, money, and compliance with local laws. A large structure can no longer be the design of one person but must be the work of many. Modernism and Postmodernism have been criticized by some members of the architectural profession who feel that successful architecture is not a personal, philosophical, or aesthetic pursuit by individualists; rather, it has to consider everyday needs of people and use technology to create livable environments, with the design process being informed by studies of behavioral, environmental, and social sciences.

Environmental sustainability has become a mainstream issue, with a profound effect on the architectural profession. Many developers, those who support the financing of buildings, have become educated to encourage the facilitation of environmentally sustainable design, rather than solutions based primarily on immediate cost. Major examples of this can be found in passive solar building design, greener roof designs, biodegradable materials, and more attention to a structure's energy usage. This major shift in architecture has also changed architecture schools to focus more on the environment. There has been an acceleration in the number of buildings that seek to meet green building sustainable design principles. Sustainable practices that were at the core of vernacular architecture increasingly provide inspiration for environmentally and socially sustainable contemporary techniques. The U.S. Green Building Council's LEED (Leadership in Energy and Environmental Design) rating system has been influential in this.

Concurrently, the recent movements of New Urbanism, Metaphoric architecture, contemporary Traditional architecture, and New Classical architecture promote a sustainable approach towards construction that appreciates and develops smart growth, architectural tradition, and classical design. This contrasts with modernist and globally uniform architecture, as well as leaning against solitary housing estates and suburban sprawl. Glass curtain walls, which were the hallmark of the ultra-modern urban life in many countries, surfaced even in developing countries such as Nigeria, where international styles had been represented since the mid-20th Century, mostly because of the leanings of foreign-trained architects.

== Types ==
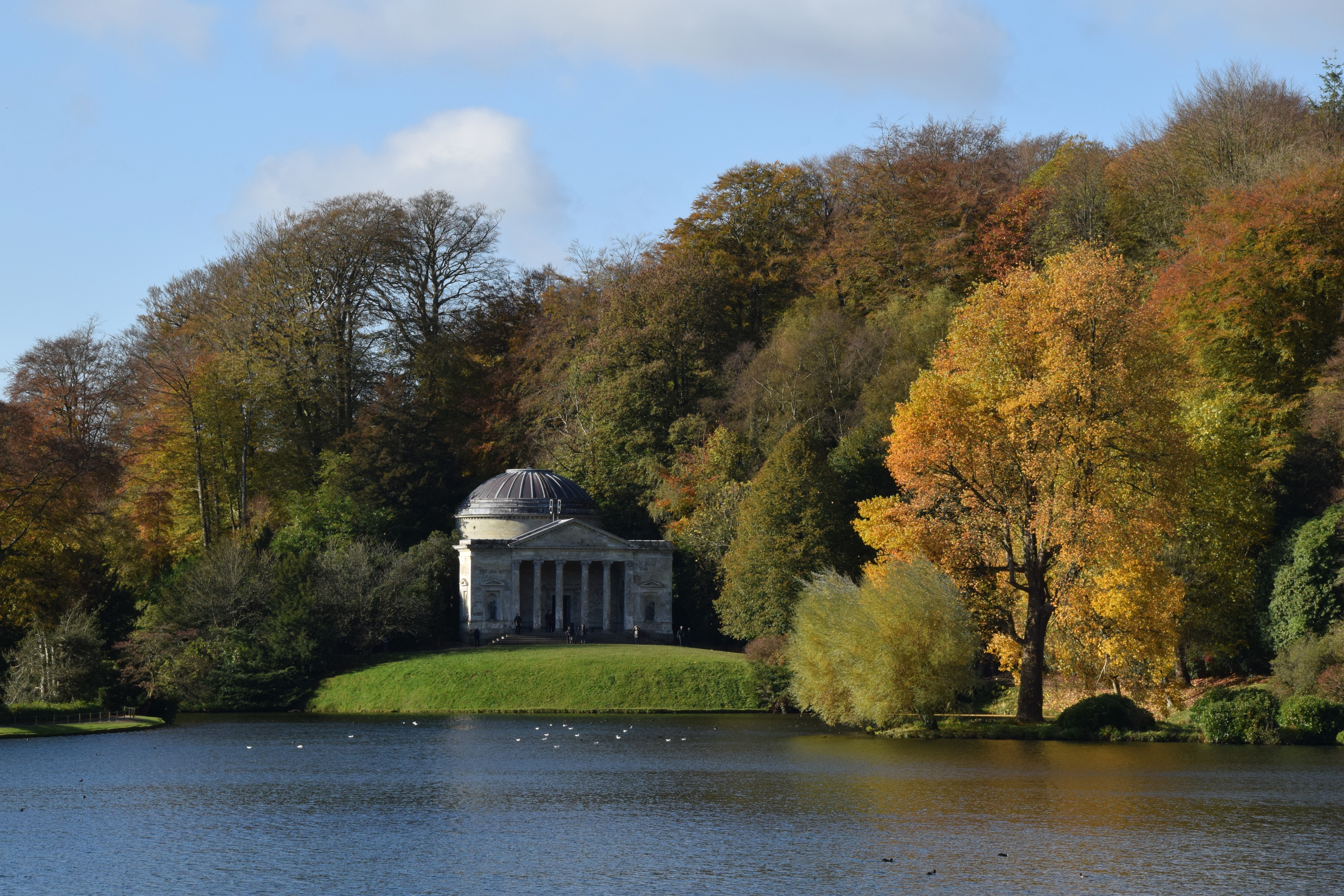
Stourhead in Wiltshire, England, designed by Henry Hoare (1705–1785)

=== Residential architecture ===
Residential architecture is the design that functionally fits the user's lifestyle while adhering to the building codes and zoning laws.

=== Commercial architecture ===
Commercial architecture is the design of commercial buildings that serve the needs of businesses, the government, and religious institutions.

=== Industrial architecture ===
Industrial architecture is the design of specialized industrial buildings, whose primary focus is designing buildings that can fulfil their function while ensuring the safe movement of labor and goods in the facility.

=== Landscape architecture ===
Landscape architecture is the design of outdoor public areas, landmarks, and structures to achieve environmental, social-behavioral, or aesthetic outcomes. It involves the systematic investigation of existing social, ecological, and soil conditions and processes in the landscape and the design of interventions that will produce the desired outcome. The scope of the profession includes landscape design, site planning, stormwater management, environmental restoration, parks and recreation planning, visual resource management, green infrastructure planning and provision, and private estate and residence landscape master planning and design, all at varying scales of design, planning, and management. A practitioner in the profession of landscape architecture is called a landscape architect.

=== Interior architecture ===
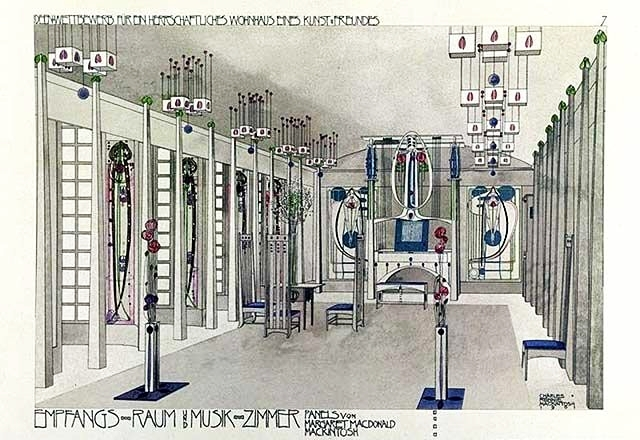
Charles Rennie Mackintosh—Music Room 1901

Interior architecture is the design of a space that has been created by structural boundaries and the human interaction within these boundaries. It can also be the initial design and plan for use, then later redesigned to accommodate a changed purpose or a significantly revised design for adaptive reuse of the building shell. The latter is often part of sustainable architecture practices, conserving resources through "recycling" a structure by adaptive redesign. Generally referred to as the spatial art of environmental design, form, and practice, interior architecture is the process through which the interiors of buildings are designed, concerned with all aspects of the human uses of structural spaces.

=== Urban design ===
Urban design is the process of designing and shaping the physical features of cities, towns, and villages. In contrast to architecture, which focuses on the design of individual buildings, urban design deals with the larger scale of groups of buildings, streets and public spaces, whole neighborhoods and districts, and entire cities, with the goal of making urban areas functional, attractive, and sustainable.

Urban design is an interdisciplinary field that uses elements of many built environment professions, including landscape architecture, urban planning, architecture, civil engineering, and municipal engineering. It is common for professionals in all these disciplines to practice urban design. In more recent times, different sub-subfields of urban design have emerged, such as strategic urban design, landscape urbanism, water-sensitive urban design, and sustainable urbanism.

=== Green Design ===
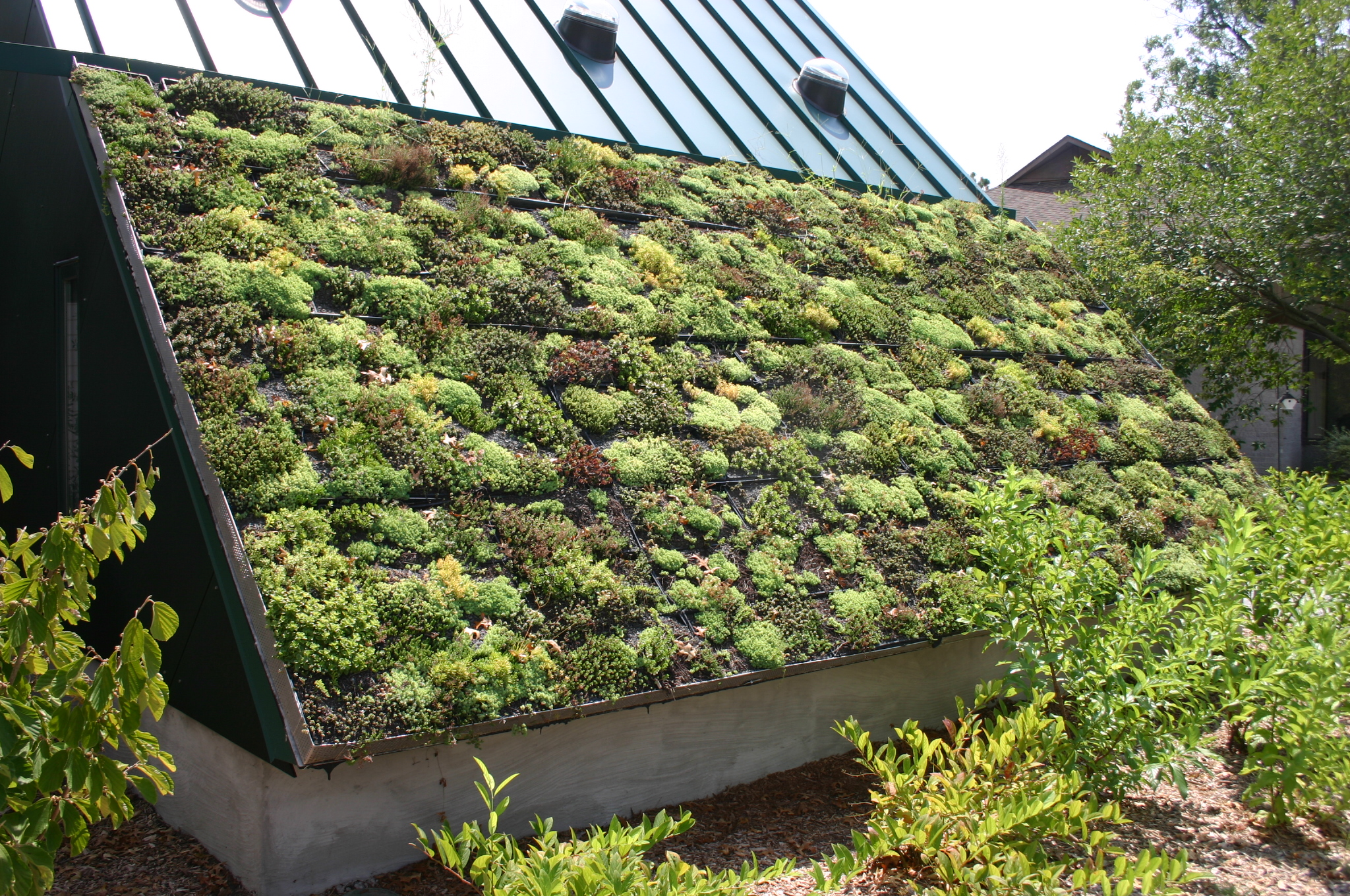
Green Roof

Green Building is about the structure and application process of minimizing the environmental impact of buildings. Interest in sustainable design grew after the 1973 oil embargo, which highlighted the need for policies like the Clean Water Act and the creation of the Environmental Protection Agency. This motivated a small group of architects who were passionate and environmentally conscious to start designing more sustainably. Green Design uses renewable energy strategies such as green roofs, passive heating/cooling, and reduced materials to help create sustainable and high-performance structures that blend with the nature around them. Sustainable materials like reclaimed wood, bamboo, and recycled materials are used to limit resource waste. Water conservation is another key strategy, utilizing systems that make sure to harvest rainwater and recycle greywater. Architects also orient buildings to take advantage of the climate, utilizing the sun for natural lighting and the wind for ventilation. Together, these strategies create high-performance buildings that work with nature rather than against it.

=== Other types of architecture ===
==== Naval architecture ====
Body plan of a ship showing the hull form

Naval architecture, also known as naval engineering, is an engineering discipline dealing with the engineering design process, shipbuilding, maintenance, and operation of marine vessels and structures. Naval architecture involves basic and applied research, design, development, design evaluation, and calculations during all stages of the life of a marine vehicle. Preliminary design of the vessel, its detailed design, construction, trials, operation and maintenance, launching, and dry-docking are the main activities involved. Ship design calculations are also required for ships being modified (by means of conversion, rebuilding, modernization, or repair). Naval architecture also involves the formulation of safety regulations and damage control rules and the approval and certification of ship designs to meet statutory and non-statutory requirements.

==== Metaphorical "architectures" ====
"Architecture" is used as a metaphor for many modern techniques or fields for structuring abstractions. These include:

- Computer architecture, a set of rules and methods that describe the functionality, organization, and implementation of computer systems, with software architecture, hardware architecture, and network architecture covering more specific aspects.
- Business architecture, defined as "a blueprint of the enterprise that provides a common understanding of the organization and is used to align strategic objectives and tactical demands.” Enterprise architecture is another term.
- Cognitive architecture theories about the structure of the human mind.
- System architecture, a conceptual model that defines the structure, behavior, and more views of any type of system.

==== Seismic architecture ====
The term 'seismic architecture' or 'earthquake architecture' was first introduced in 1985 by Robert Reitherman. The phrase "earthquake architecture" is used to describe a degree of architectural expression of earthquake resistance or implication of architectural configuration, form, or style in earthquake resistance. It is also used to describe buildings in which seismic design considerations impacted their architecture. It may be considered a new aesthetic approach in designing structures in seismically prone areas. The wide breadth of expressive possibilities ranges from metaphorical uses of seismic issues to the more straightforward exposure of seismic technology. While outcomes of an earthquake architecture can be very diverse in their physical manifestations, architectural expression of seismic principles can also take many forms and levels of sophistication.

== See also ==
- Architectural design competition
- Architectural engineering
- Architectural technology
- Ephemeral architecture
- Index of architecture articles
- List of BIM software
- Outline of architecture
- Reverse architecture
- Timeline of architecture
