= Afromodernism =

Modernist architecture style in Africa

Afromodernism is modernist architecture in Africa that incorporates local building materials such as adobe bricks and thatch as well as modern materials like reinforced concrete and works them along minimalist forms. It emerged in the early 1960s.
