= Manjusri Vasthu Vidya Sastra =

Mañjuśrībhāsitacitrakarmaśāstra (Treatise on iconography as spoken by Mañjuśrī) is a Sinhalese Buddhist text dealing with construction of monasteries and Buddhist temples.

== Description ==
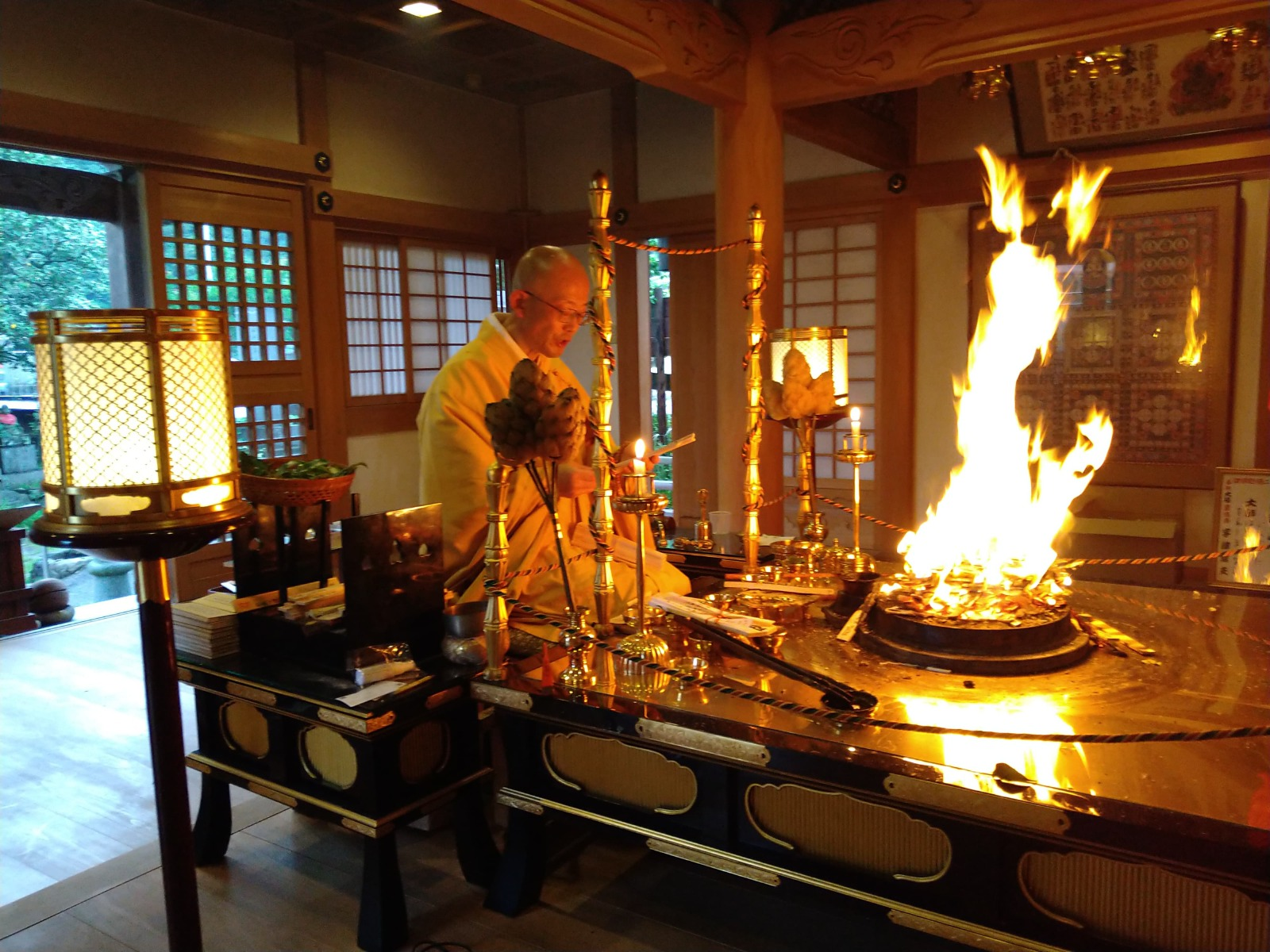
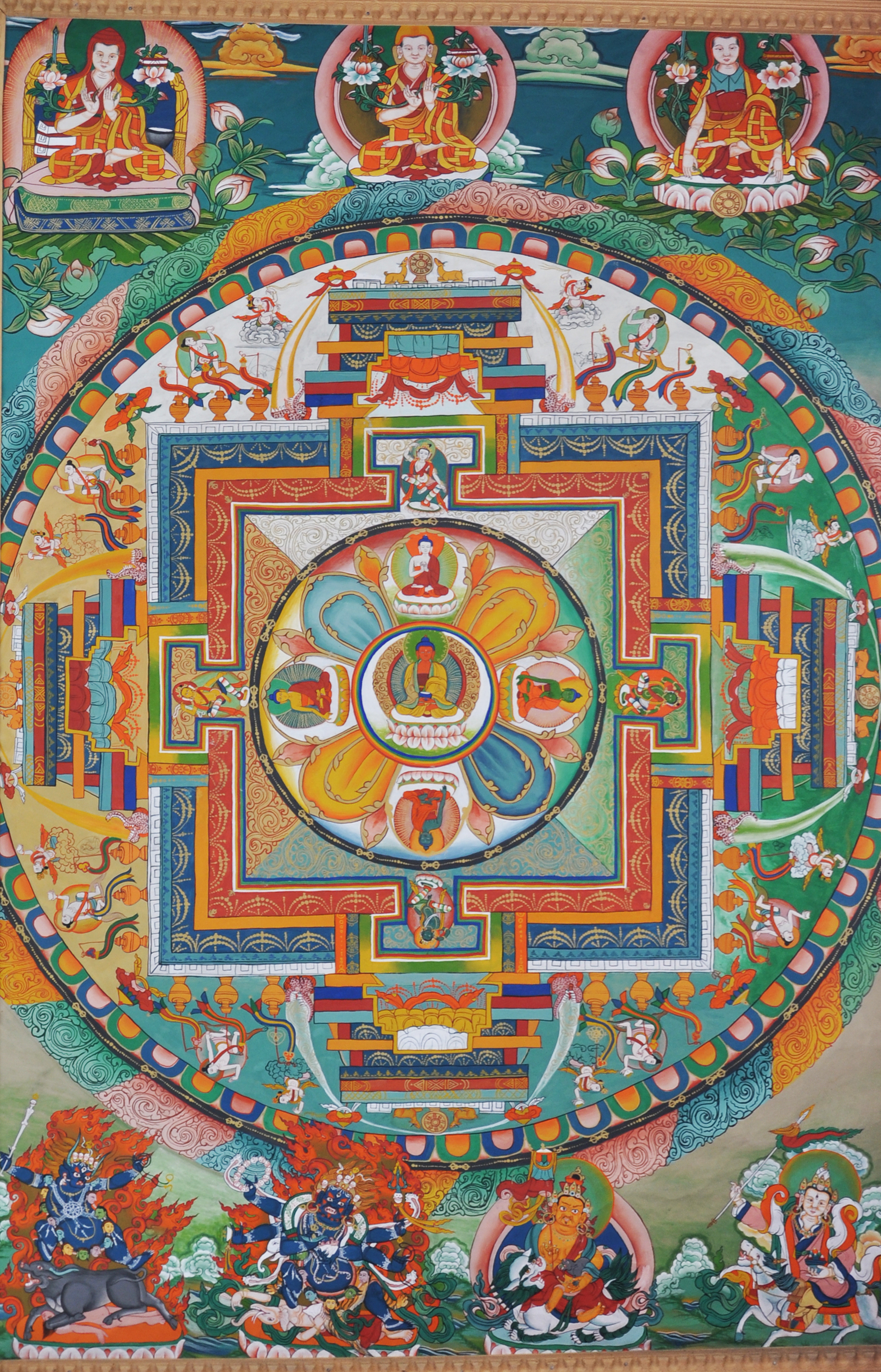
The text discusses performance of Buddhist tantric homa ceremonies (as shown in the left being performed by a Shingon priest) to consecrate a Five Tathagata mandala (as shown in the Tibetan Buddhist mural on the right) inside the garbhagriha of the temple.

A single manuscript of this text, written in Sanskrit language in Sinhalese script, was acquired by S. Paranavitana in 1950s from a Buddhist temple in Gampola. After his death, it was acquired by the National Archives of Colombo in 1972. The text appears as a dialogue between Manjushri and Viswakarma. Given the ample references to application of mantras and fire-ceremony in consecration of monasteries and temples, with the invocation of the 5 Buddhas, it is of evidently a Vajrayana nature that was practiced in the Abhayagiri vihara. Based on its Vajrayana content and application of Sinhala script, the text can be dated to be from 11th century.

== Content ==
Although previously, texts on Buddhist iconography like the Bimbalakṣaṇa ascribed to Śāriputra had been found in Sri Lanka, this text was larger than the others. It consists of 1,600 slokas divided into seventeen chapters. These discuss

1. Characteristics of ideal locations for construction activities
2. Twenty four types of monasteries
3. Varieties of caityas
4. Collection of suitable wood for construction
5. Dimensions for building construction
6. Setting the ground-plan for temples
7. Construction of idols
8. Construction of idols (continued)
9. Construction of idols (continued)
10. Construction of idols (continued)
11. Construction of idols (continued)
12. Construction of idols (continued)
13. Dimensions for idol construction
14. Description of plumb lines
15. Iconography of the Five Buddhas
16. Preparation of pigments for painting
17. Consecration of idols

Regarding the procedure of idol construction and consecration rituals, the text heavily borrows much of its content from shilpasastra texts circulating in South India.

== Publication ==
In 1989, the text was published in two volumes from New Delhi with the Sanskrit original rendered in Devanagari script and English translation under the name of The Vāstuvidyā ascribed to Mañjuśrī, edited by Dr. E. W. Marasinghe, librarian of the University of Perandeniya. The first volume, covering the first three chapters was titled Mañjuśrībhāsitavāstuvidyāśāstra (Vāstuvidyā as spoken by Mañjuśrī).
