= Reverse architecture =

Concept in systems analysis

Reverse architecture is a process of deducing the underlying architecture and design of a system by observing its behaviour. It has its roots in the field of reverse engineering.

Practicing reverse architecture is used to decipher the logistics of building. There are a variety of techniques available, the most notable being architecture driven modelling.

== See also ==
- Object Management Group
- Software modernization
- Software mining
