= Bomber (computer virus) =

DOS-platform based virus

Malware details
- Alias: Commander Bomber
- Type: DOS
- Subtype: File and boot infector
- Classification: Virus
- Isolation date: 1992
- Origin: Bulgaria
- Author: Dark Avenger

Bomber (also known as Commander Bomber) is a DOS polymorphic memory resident computer virus, known for its technique of "patchy infection". This method of infection is very similar to that which is utilised by the OneHalf computer virus. According to Vesselin Bontchev, Bomber was created by Bulgarian virus writer the Dark Avenger. It was first isolated in 1992.

Bomber was not encrypted. Contrary to the usual method of infecting executables (which is to append virus body to the executable and to change the entry point), it inserts several fragments ("patches") of its code in random places inside the file. These fragments transfer control to each other using various mechanisms. The method of infection makes the detection of the virus difficult by anti-virus programs, and it means that they would have to scan the file in its entirety in order to detect the virus. It was the first ever computer virus known to use this stealth strategy.

The size of the Bomber executable is approximately 4096 bytes and contains the following text:

COMMANDER BOMBER WAS HERE
[DAME] [DAME]
