= Alexia Massalin =

American computer scientist and programmer

- Born: Henry Massalin; January 1, 1962; Astoria, Queens, New York
- Citizenship: United States
- Education: Cooper Union School of Engineering, B.E. M.E., 1984; Columbia University, Ph.D., computer science, 1992
- Known for: Superoptimization
- Scientific career
- Fields: Operating systems, optimizing compilers
- Workplaces: MicroUnity Systems Engineering, Inc.
- Thesis: Synthesis: An Efficient Implementation of Fundamental Operating System Services (1992)
- Doctoral advisor: Calton Pu

Alexia Massalin (formerly Henry Massalin) is an American computer scientist and programmer. She pioneered the concept of superoptimization, and designed the Synthesis kernel, a small kernel with a Unix compatibility layer that makes heavy use of self-modifying code for efficiency.

== Life and career ==
After high school, she was given a scholarship to the Cooper Union School of Engineering in Manhattan, where she obtained a bachelor's and master's degree. She went to obtain her Ph.D. in computer science from Columbia University in 1992, studying under professor Calton Pu.

In the 1980s she worked for Philon Inc., a New York start up specializing in optimizing compilers. In October 1992, Massalin joined MicroUnity as a research scientist, where she became responsible for signal-processing modules and software architecture.

=== Synthesis ===
Massalin's first breakthrough product came while studying at Columbia. Massalin developed Synthesis, an operating system kernel that allocated resources, ran security and low-level hardware interfaces, and created executable code to improve performance. Synthesis optimized critical operating system code using run-time information, which was a new insight previously thought impractical. To support Synthesis, Massalin invented object-like data structures called Quajects, which contain both data and code information.

Massalin is still working on broadband microprocessors.

== Personal life ==
Her parents were Croatian refugees from Trieste. In the 1940s, they moved to Astoria, Queens, New York, where her father became a construction worker.

In a 1996 article in Wired magazine, the author Gary Andrew Poole said she "could be the Einstein of our time." She was well known for offering piggyback rides to people she met, which included notable computer scientists such as Dennis Ritchie, Ken Thompson, and artificial intelligence pioneer Marvin Minsky.
