= MPACT 2 =

Mpact-2 is a 125 MHz vector-processing graphics, audio and video media processor, a second generation in the Mpact family of Chromatic Research media processors, which can be used only as a co-processor to the main central processing unit (CPU) of a microcomputer.

Hardware using the Mpact-2 uses OEM firmware to provide plug-and-play facility, and may be used with either a PCI or AGP bus.

== UAD-1 DSP cards ==
The UAD-1 was a digital signal processor (DSP) card sold by Universal Audio using the Mpact-2 developed by Chromatic (acquired by ATI Technologies in November 1998), using the DSP, rather than the host computer's CPU, to process audio plug-ins. This allows accurate, but processor-intensive, reverbs, EQs, compressors and limiters to be handled in real time and without burdening the CPU. 3D functionality is hard-wired. The UAD-1 was superseded by the UAD-2, based on the Analog Devices 21369 and 21469 DSPs, in 2009.

UAD-1 hardware was produced with three interfaces: PCI (UAD-1), PCI Express (UAD-1e), and ExpressCard (UAD-Xpander). The cards were offered by Chromatic Research (formerly named Xenon Microsystems), and were part of the Chromatic Mpact 2 Video Adapter.
