= Whale (computer virus) =

Computer virus discovered in 1990

Malware details
- Alias: Mother Fish
- Type: computer virus
- Isolation date: July 1,1990
- Origin: Hamburg, Germany

Technical details
- Size: 9,216 Bytes

The Whale virus is a computer virus discovered on July 1, 1990. The file size, at 9,216 bytes, was for its time the largest virus ever discovered. It is known for using several advanced "stealth" methods.

== Description ==
After the file becomes resident in the system memory below the 640K DOS boundary, system slow-down occurs as a result of the virus' polymorphic code. Symptoms include video flicker and output to screen appearing very slowly. Files may seem to "hang" even though they will eventually execute correctly.

It was reported that one infected program displayed the following message when run:

THE WHALE IN SEARCH OF THE 8 FISH
I AM '~knzyvo}' IN HAMBURG addr error D9EB,02

Shifting the letters of "~knzyvo}" left in the ASCII table by 10 characters turns the string into "tadpoles".

== See also ==
- Computer virus
