= Mpact =

Mpact may refer to:

- Mpact Girls Clubs
- !mpact Comics, a superhero imprint for DC Comics
- MPACT!, a media processor from Chromatic Research
