= 1260 (computer virus) =

IBM PC DOS computer file virus

Malware details
- Technical name: 1260
- Alias: V2P1, Chameleon
- Type: DOS
- Subtype: Nonresident .COM-Infector
- Classification: Virus
- Family: N/A
- Isolation date: 1990
- Origin: USA
- Author: Mark Washburn

1260, or V2PX, was a polymorphic computer virus written in 1990 by Mark Washburn. Derived from Ralf Burger's publication of the disassembled Vienna Virus source code, the 1260 added a cipher and varied its signature by randomizing its decryption algorithm. Both the 1260 and Vienna infect .COM files in the current or PATH directories upon execution. Changing an authenticated executable file is detected by most modern computer operating systems.
