= Zmist =

Computer Virus

Malware details
- Alias: Z0mbie.Mistfall
- Type: Computer virus
- Isolation date: 2002
- Origin: Russia
- Author: Z0mbie

Technical details
- Platform: Windows
- Size: 9 kbytes

Zmist (also known as Z0mbie.Mistfall) is a metamorphic computer virus created by the Russian virus writer known as Z0mbie. It was the first virus to use a technique known as "code integration". In the words of Ferrie and Ször:

This virus supports a unique new technique: code integration. The Mistfall engine contained in it is capable of decompiling Portable Executable files to [their] smallest elements, requiring 32 MB of memory. Zmist will insert itself into the code: it moves code blocks out of the way, inserts itself, regenerates code and data references, including relocation information, and rebuilds the executable.

== Variants ==
- Zmist.gen!674CD7362358 - discovered in 2012.
- ZMist!IK - discovered 2011 - 2012.
- Zmist.A - discovered in 2006 - 2007.

== See also ==
- Simile, a well-known metamorphic virus
- Computer virus
