= Fred Cohen =

American computer scientist

Frederick B. Cohen
- Education: University of Southern California (Ph.D., 1986); University of Pittsburgh (M.S., 1980); Carnegie-Mellon University B.S.E.E., 1977)
- Known for: Computer virus research
- Scientific career
- Fields: Computer virology

Frederick B. Cohen (born 1956) is an American computer scientist and best known as the inventor of computer virus defense techniques. He gave the definition of "computer virus". Cohen is best known for his pioneering work on computer viruses, the invention of high-integrity operating system mechanisms now in widespread use, and automation of protection management functions.

In 1983, while a student at the University of Southern California's School of Engineering, he wrote a program for a parasitic application that seized control of computer operations, one of the first computer viruses, in Leonard Adleman’s class. He wrote a short program, as an experiment, that could "infect" computers, make copies of itself, and spread from one machine to another. It was hidden inside a larger, legitimate program, which was loaded into a computer on a floppy disk.

One of the few solid theoretical results in the study of computer viruses is Cohen's 1987 demonstration that there is no algorithm that can perfectly detect all possible viruses.

Cohen also believed there are positive viruses and he had created one called the compression virus which spreading would infect all executable files on a computer, not to destroy, but to make them smaller.

During the past 10 years of his research work, Fred Cohen wrote over 60 professional publications and 11 books.

== Papers ==
- 1991, Trends In Computer Virus Research
- 1991, A Case for Benevolent Viruses
- 1991, The Computer Security Encyclopedia - Computer Viruses
- 1992, A Formal Definition of Computer Worms and Some Related Results
- 1989, Models of Practical Defenses Against Computer Viruses
- 1988, On the Implications of Computer Viruses and Methods of Defense
- 1984, Computer Viruses - Theory and Experiments
- 1989, Models of Practical Defenses Against Computer Viruses
