= MacMag =

Computer virus

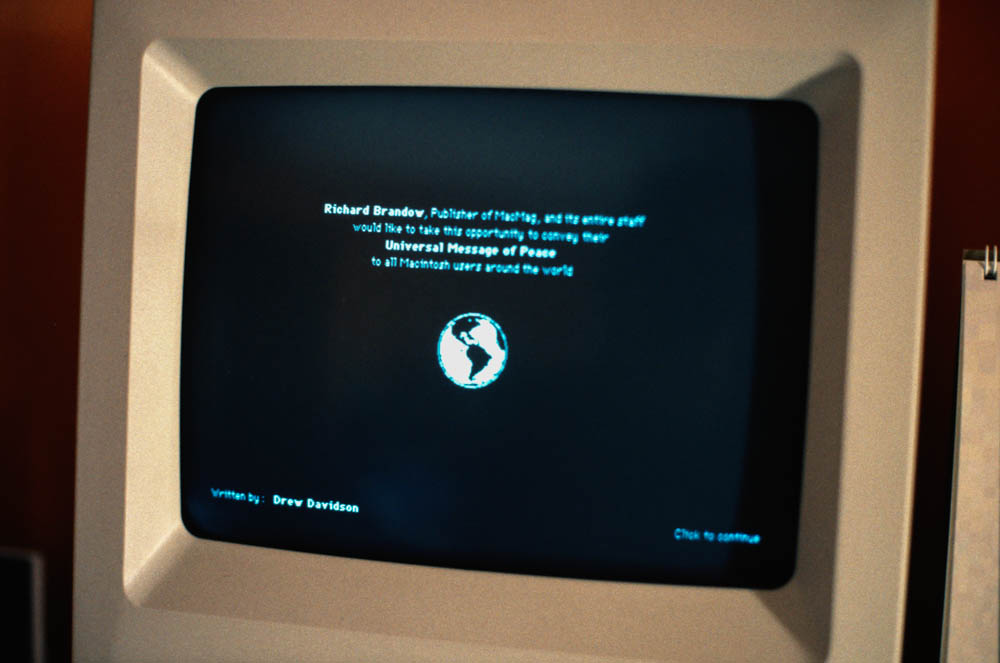
- The MacMag virus's 'Universal Peace' message, as displayed on a Mac SE in March 1988

Malware details
- Aliases: Drew; Brandow; Aldus; Peace; World Peace
- Type: Macintosh
- Subtype: Nuisance
- Classification: Virus
- Isolation date: December 1987
- Origin: Montréal, Québec, Canada
- Authors: Richard Brandow, Drew Davidson

The MacMag virus, also known by various other names, is a computer virus introduced in 1988 by Richard Brandow, who at the time was editor and publisher of MacMag computer magazine in Montréal.

== Operation of the virus ==
The virus infects classic Macintosh computers, and the intention was that on 2 March 1988 all infected computers would show the message "RICHARD BRANDOW, publisher of MacMag, and its entire staff would like to take this opportunity to convey their UNIVERSAL MESSAGE OF PEACE to all Macintosh users around the world", and the virus would then delete itself. According to the virus itself, it was written by Drew Davidson. The virus is a boot sector virus, which is spread in the form of a HyperCard stack called "New Apple Products," which contained very poor pictures of the then-new Apple scanner. It copied a resource into the System folder on a Mac, as an "initial" program, which would run automatically every time the system started up. The program then copied itself onto any bootable disk which was opened.

== Damage caused ==
Brandow intended the virus to be benign, giving a friendly message and causing no harm. However a bug in the virus caused infected Mac II computers to undergo system crashes before this date. Another bug, which affected very few users, caused files other than the original virus to be deleted during the termination stage. It also caused a great deal of anxiety among users who found that their computers were infected with an unwanted program the nature of which was unknown. The virus infected Aldus Corporation's FreeHand, and Aldus had to recall thousands of copies of FreeHand, leading them to threaten legal action.

== Brandow's attitudes to the virus ==
Brandow persistently called himself the "author" of the virus, but in fact he did not write it. He commissioned it to be written, and the virus internally contained the name "Drew Davidson". He never apologized, and always indicated that he was proud of his action. When confronted by users who had been adversely affected by the virus he used to reply with an argument about the level of handgun ownership in the United States.
