= Intel LANSpool =

Network printer administration software by Intel

LANSpool
- Developer: Intel
- Stable release: 3.5 / 1993?
- Operating system: Novell NetWare
- Type: Computer networking
- License: -
- Website: No official site

LANSPool was network printer administration software developed by Intel. The package was designed specifically for the Novell NetWare network operating system. The software allowed users to share printers and faxes and for administrators to modify LAN printing operations. The software takes its name from the acronym for local area network (LAN) and the spooling technique by which computers send information to slow peripherals such as printers.

In March 1992, Intel announced that users of version 3.01 of the software might be at risk from the Michelangelo virus as the manufacturer had found the virus on master copies of the 5¼-inch floppy disks.
