= Sarah Gordon (computer scientist) =

Computer security researcher

Sarah Gordon is a computer security researcher, responsible for early scientific and academic work on virus writers, hackers, and social issues in computing. She was among the first computer scientists to propose a multidisciplinary approach to computer security. Known primarily for early work on the relationship between people and computers, much of her original technical research was published or presented between the late 1980s and mid-1990s. She continues to publish in the field of Artificial Intelligence, with current work focusing on the ethical implications of AI technologies, testing and evaluation of AI systems, and the risks of emotional mimicry in human–AI interaction. Her recent publications include the book Built to Be Believed (Leanpub, 2024) and the article "Built to Be Believed" (Virus Bulletin, August 2025).

Two of the first "concept viruses" for Microsoft products were discovered by Gordon, refuting the common belief that it was impossible to contract a virus via email and demonstrating the vulnerability of Microsoft Word to macro viruses in 1995. She also wrote the first report on Linux viruses in the wild. She is known for inventing the term "vX" to refer to Virus Exchange. Gordon has always been fascinated with linguistics, and has introduced several other terms into the computer lexicon, including "trigger foot" and "meaningfulness".

Gordon was appointed to the computer science graduate faculty of the Florida Institute of Technology in 2004. Although she has worked for several computer security companies, including Dr. Solomon's Software, Command Software, IBM Research, and Symantec Corporation, her work has continued to be primarily academic. Gordon is an alumnus of Indiana University South Bend, where she obtained a Bachelor of Science degree in 1997. She has a master's degree in Human Behaviour and Professional Counseling, and a Ph.D in Computer Science from Middlesex University.
