= Calton Pu =

Taiwanese-American electrical engineer

Calton Pu is a Taiwanese-American electrical engineer from the Georgia Institute of Technology in Atlanta, Georgia. He was named Fellow of the Institute of Electrical and Electronics Engineers (IEEE) in 2016 for contributions to system software specialization, information security, and services computing.

Pu was born in Taiwan and spent his childhood in Brazil, before emigrating to the United States.
