= MicroUnity =

MicroUnity Systems Engineering, Inc.
- Industry: Computer hardware and software
- Founded: 1988
- Headquarters: Los Altos, California, USA
- Key people: John Moussouris

MicroUnity Systems Engineering, Inc. was a private company located in Los Altos, California and an early developer of broadband microprocessor technologies licensed widely across digital media industries. John Moussouris was the CEO and Chairman for MicroUnity. In the 1990s the company had been developing what was described as a supercomputer-on-a-chip, designed to enable appliances to process and transmit videos, graphics, and audio.

== About ==
MicroUnity was founded in 1988 by John Moussouris, a physicist trained at Harvard University and as a Rhodes Scholar at Oxford University who had co-founded MIPS Computer Systems. The Chief Architect was Craig Hansen. Early investors include Moussouris’ Harvard classmate William Randolph Hearst III, the publishing and media executive who became a partner at venture firm Kleiner Perkins.

In the early 1990s, MicroUnity was backed by over $100 million from companies like Hewlett-Packard, Microsoft, Motorola, and telecommunications leaders like Time Warner and John Malone at Tele-Communications Inc.

The company's main focus was a programmable media processor chip and associated software aimed at set-top boxes and other systems.

MicroUnity kept its product development secret until 1995. In early 1996, the company published details at COMPCON of its media processor hardware and software designs. The technology processed media data of various types and width in a 128-bit data path in parallel.

MicroUnity developed its first designs in BiCMOS at a time when Intel Pentium Pro and Sun Microsystems SPARC were designed in BiCMOS. Company patents describe technologies intended for integration of analog media interfaces with digital circuits.

In 2010, MicroUnity filed suit with 22 cellphone companies including some chip, system, and service providers on 15 of its patents on devices that "include TI's OMAP-3 and -4 processors, Qualcomm Snapdragon processors, the Apple iPhone 3GS, Google Nexus One, Motorola Droid, Nokia N900 and Palm Pre handsets..." The litigation continued in the U.S. District Court for the Eastern District of Texas, where in 2011 the court denied motions to sever the claims and transfer the case to the Northern District of California.
