= Gary Andrew Poole =

American journalist and author

- Occupations: Journalist, author
- Writing career
- Subject: Nonfiction
- Website: garyandrewpoole.com

Gary Andrew Poole is an American journalist and author. He has written for The New York Times, The Atlantic, Esquire and Time.

== Books ==
Poole is the author of The Galloping Ghost: Red Grange, An American Football Legend (Houghton Mifflin, 2008) and PacMan: Behind The Scenes With Manny Pacquiao (Da Capo, 2010).

== Journalism ==
Poole began his career writing about the Internet and the birth of the World Wide Web. He wrote extensively about technology for publications such as Wired, The New York Times and Forbes ASAP. Poole was one of the first journalists to write about the Internet boom and the cultural impact of social networks, and he is considered the first journalist to write about the "digital divide". Poole primarily covers sports for Time, Esquire, and The Atlantic. His 2008 book The Galloping Ghost (Houghton Mifflin) is a critically acclaimed biography of Red Grange who played football in the 1920s. In November 2010, his biography of boxer Manny Pacquiao was published. The book was praised by Sports Illustrated, the Philippine Inquirer, the Los Angeles Times, the Daily Telegraph, the South China Morning Post, The Wall Street Journal, and New York Newsday, among other publications. The Observer and The Guardian named PacMan: Behind the Scenes With Manny Pacquiao one of the best sports books of the year. The book, which has been described as "brutally honest", was excerpted in the online version of The Ring magazine and in The Atlantic.

Poole is a practitioner of long-form narrative nonfiction. His profiles, travel stories, and essays have appeared in The New York Times, The Independent, The Globe and Mail, GQ magazine, the Los Angeles Times Magazine, San Francisco Magazine, and other publications.

Poole has also appeared on Sirius Satellite Radio, NPR and the BBC. Poole was featured in the Emmy-nominated documentary film, Larger Than Life: The Red Grange Story. He also appeared on the Biography Channel's documentary on Manny Pacquiao, and the HBO series On Freddie Roach.

== Education ==
Poole is a graduate of Columbia University's Graduate School of Journalism.
