= Brain (computer virus) =

1986 IBM PC boot sector computer virus

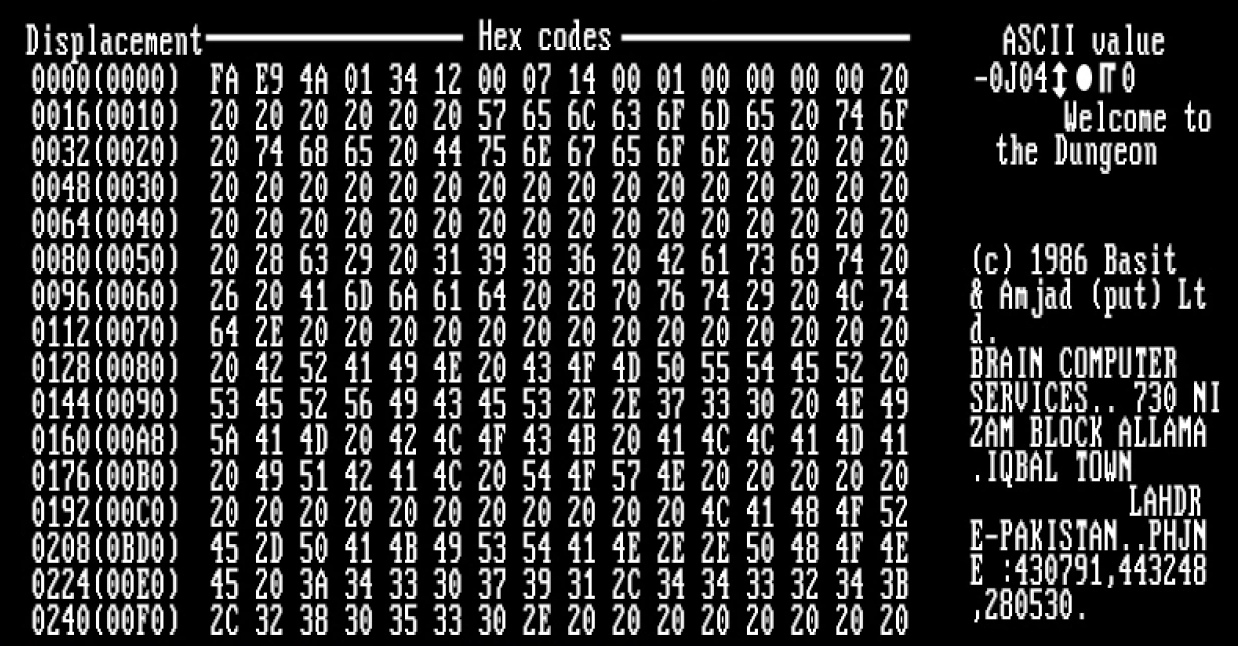
- The boot sector of an infected floppy
- Other names: Ashar (older variant)
- Original authors: Amjad Farooq Alvi and Basit Farooq Alvi
- Release: 19 January 1986
- Platform: IBM Personal Computer, IBM PC compatibles
- Type: Boot sector computer virus

Brain is the industry standard name for a computer virus that was released in its first form on 19 January 1986, and is considered to be the first computer virus for the IBM Personal Computer (IBM PC) and compatibles.

== Description ==
Brain affects the PC by replacing the boot sector of a floppy disk with a copy of the virus. The real boot sector is moved to another sector and marked as bad. Infected disks usually have five kilobytes of bad sectors. The disk label is usually changed to ©Brain, and the following text can be seen in infected boot sectors:

Welcome to the Dungeon (c) 1986 Amjads (pvt) Ltd VIRUS_SHOE RECORD V9.0 Dedicated to the dynamic memories of millions of viruses who are no longer with us today - Thanks GOODNESS!!! BEWARE OF THE er..VIRUS : this program is catching program follows after these ....$#@%$@!!

There are many minor and major variations to that version of the text. The virus slows down the floppy disk drive and makes seven kilobytes of memory unavailable to DOS. Brain was written by Basit Farooq Alvi and Amjad Farooq Alvi, who at the time lived in Chah Miran, near Lahore Railway Station, in Lahore, Pakistan. The Alvi brothers told Time magazine they had written it to protect their medical software from illegal copying, and it was supposed to target copyright infringement only. The cryptic message "Welcome to the Dungeon", a safeguard and reference to an early programming forum on Dungeon BBS, appeared after a year because the brothers licensed a beta version of the code. The brothers could not be contacted to receive the final release of this version of the program.

Brain lacks code for dealing with hard disk partitioning, and avoids infecting hard disks by checking the most significant bit of the BIOS drive number being accessed. Brain does not infect the disk if the bit is set, unlike other viruses at the time, which paid no attention to disk partitioning and consequently destroyed data stored on hard disks by treating them in the same way as floppy disks. Brain often went undetected, partially due to this deliberate non-destructiveness, especially when the user paid little to no attention to the low speed of floppy disk access.

The virus came complete with address and three phone numbers, and a message that told the user that their machine was infected and to call them for inoculation:

Welcome to the Dungeon © 1986 Amjads (pvt). BRAIN COMPUTER SERVICES 730 NIZAM
BLOCK ALLAMA IQBAL TOWN LAHORE-PAKISTAN PHONE: 430791,443248,280530. Beware of this VIRUS.... Contact us for vaccination...

This software was originally used to track a heart monitoring application for the IBM PC, and people were distributing illicit copies of the disks. This tracking tool was supposed to stop and track illegal copies of the media; however, the program also sometimes used the last five kilobytes on an Apple floppy, making additional saves to the disk by other programs impossible.

== Author response ==
When the brothers began to receive a large number of phone calls from people in the United Kingdom, the United States, and elsewhere, demanding that they disinfect their machines, they were stunned and tried to explain to the outraged callers that their motivation had not been malicious. Their phone lines were overloaded. The brothers, with another brother, Shahid Farooq Alvi, continued business in Pakistan, as Brain NET Internet service providers with a company called Brain Telecommunication Limited.

In 2011, 25 years after Brain was released, Mikko Hyppönen of F-Secure went to Pakistan to interview Amjad and Basit for a documentary. Being inspired by this documentary and its widespread popularity, a group of Pakistani bloggers interviewed Amjad and Basit, under the banner of Bloggerine.

== See also ==
- Rootkit
- Timeline of computer viruses and worms
