= Self-modifying code =

Source code that alters its instructions to the hardware while executing

In computer science, self-modifying code (SMC or SMoC) is code that alters its own instructions while it is executing – usually to reduce the instruction path length and improve performance or simply to reduce otherwise repetitively similar code, thus simplifying maintenance. The term is usually only applied to code where the self-modification is deliberate and intentional, not in situations where code accidentally modifies itself due to an error such as a buffer overflow.

Self-modifying code can involve overwriting existing instructions or generating new code at run time and transferring control to that code.

Self-modification can be used as an alternative to the method of "flag setting" and conditional program branching, used primarily to reduce the number of times a condition needs to be tested.

The method is frequently used for conditionally invoking test/debugging code without requiring additional computational overhead for every input/output cycle.

The modifications may be performed:

- only during initialization – based on input parameters (when the process is more commonly described as software "configuration" and is somewhat analogous, in hardware terms, to setting jumpers for printed circuit boards). Alteration of program entry pointers is an equivalent indirect method of self-modification, but requiring the co-existence of one or more alternative instruction paths, increasing the program size.
- throughout execution ("on the fly") – based on particular program states that have been reached during the execution

In either case, the modifications may be performed directly to the machine code instructions themselves, by overlaying new instructions over the existing ones (for example, altering a compare and branch to an unconditional branch or alternatively a NOP).

In the IBM System/360 architecture and its successors up to z/Architecture, an EXECUTE (EX) instruction logically overlays the second byte of its target instruction with the low-order 8 bits of register 1. This provides the effect of self-modification, although the actual instruction in storage is not altered.

== Application in low and high level languages ==
Self-modification can be accomplished in a variety of ways depending upon the programming language and its support for pointers and/or access to dynamic compiler or interpreter "engines":

- overlay of existing instructions (or parts of instructions such as opcode, register, flags or addresses)
- direct creation of whole instructions or sequences of instructions in memory
- creation or modification of source code statements followed by a "mini compile" or a dynamic interpretation (see eval statement)
- creating an entire program dynamically and then executing it

=== Assembly language ===
Self-modifying code is quite straightforward to implement when using assembly language. Instructions can be dynamically created in memory (or else overlaid over existing code in non-protected program storage), in a sequence equivalent to the ones that a standard compiler may generate as the object code. With modern processors, there can be unintended side effects on the CPU cache that must be considered. The method was frequently used for testing "first time" conditions, as in this suitably commented IBM/360 assembler example. It uses instruction overlay to reduce the instruction path length by (N × 1) − 1, where N is the number of records on the file (−1 being the overhead to perform the overlay).

SUBRTN NOP OPENED      FIRST TIME HERE?
* The NOP is x'4700'<Address_of_opened>
       OI    SUBRTN+1,X'F0'  YES, CHANGE NOP TO UNCONDITIONAL BRANCH (47F0...)
       OPEN   INPUT               AND  OPEN THE INPUT FILE SINCE IT'S THE FIRST TIME THRU
OPENED GET    INPUT        NORMAL PROCESSING RESUMES HERE
      ...

Alternative code might involve testing a "flag" each time through. The unconditional branch is slightly faster than a compare instruction, as well as reducing the overall path length. In later operating systems for programs residing in protected storage, this technique could not be used, and so changing the pointer to the subroutine would be used instead. The pointer would reside in dynamic storage and could be altered at will after the first pass to bypass the OPEN (having to load a pointer first instead of a direct branch and link to the subroutine would add N instructions to the path length – but there would be a corresponding reduction of N for the unconditional branch that would no longer be required).

Below is an example in Zilog Z80 assembly language. The code increments register B in range [0, 5]. The CP compare instruction is modified on each loop.

;==========
ORG 0H
CALL FUNC00
HALT
;==========
FUNC00:
LD A,6
LD HL,label01+1
LD B,(HL)
label00:
INC B
LD (HL),B
label01:
CP $0
JP NZ,label00
RET
;==========

Self-modifying code is sometimes used to overcome limitations in a machine's instruction set. For example, in the Intel 8080 instruction set, one cannot input a byte from an input port that is specified in a register. The input port is statically encoded in the instruction itself, as the second byte of a two-byte instruction. Using self-modifying code, it is possible to store a register's contents into the second byte of the instruction, then execute the modified instruction in order to achieve the desired effect.

=== High-level languages ===
Some compiled languages explicitly permit self-modifying code. For example, the ALTER verb in COBOL may be implemented as a branch instruction that is modified during execution. Some batch programming techniques involve the use of self-modifying code. Clipper and SPITBOL also provide facilities for explicit self-modification. The Algol compiler on B6700 systems offered an interface to the operating system whereby executing code could pass a text string or a named disc file to the Algol compiler and was then able to invoke the new version of a procedure.

With interpreted languages, the "machine code" is the source text and may be susceptible to editing on-the-fly: in SNOBOL the source statements being executed are elements of a text array. Other languages, such as Perl and Python, allow programs to create new code at run-time and execute it using an eval function, but do not allow existing code to be mutated. The illusion of modification (even though no machine code is really being overwritten) is achieved by modifying function pointers, as in this JavaScript example:

    var f = function (x) {return x + 1};

    // assign a new definition to f:
    f = new Function('x', 'return x + 2');

Lisp macros also allow runtime code generation without parsing a string containing program code.

The Push programming language is a genetic programming system that is explicitly designed for creating self-modifying programs. While not a high-level language, it is not as low-level as assembly language.

==== Compound modification ====
Prior to the advent of multiple windows, command-line systems might offer a menu system involving the modification of a running command script. Suppose an MS-DOS batch file MENU.BAT contains the following: (Note: Later versions of DOS (since version 6.0) introduced the external CHOICE command (in DR-DOS also the internal command and CONFIG.SYS directive SWITCH), so, for this specific example application of a menu system, it was no longer necessary to refer to self-modifying batchjobs, however for other applications it continued to be a viable solution.)

   :start
   SHOWMENU.EXE

Upon initiation of MENU.BAT from the command line, SHOWMENU presents an on-screen menu, with possible help information, example usages and so forth. Eventually the user makes a selection that requires a command SOMENAME to be performed: SHOWMENU exits after rewriting the file MENU.BAT to contain

   :start
   SHOWMENU.EXE
   CALL SOMENAME.BAT
   GOTO start

Because the command interpreter does not compile a script file and then execute it, nor does it read the entire file into memory before starting execution, nor yet rely on the content of a record buffer, when SHOWMENU exits, the command interpreter finds a new command to execute (it is to invoke the script file SOMENAME, in a directory location and via a protocol known to SHOWMENU), and after that command completes, it goes back to the start of the script file and reactivates SHOWMENU ready for the next selection. Should the menu choice be to quit, the file would be rewritten back to its original state. Although this starting state has no use for the label, it, or an equivalent amount of text is required, because the command interpreter recalls the byte position of the next command when it is to start the next command, thus the re-written file must maintain alignment for the next command start point to indeed be the start of the next command.

Aside from the convenience of a menu system (and possible auxiliary features), this scheme means that the SHOWMENU.EXE system is not in memory when the selected command is activated, a significant advantage when memory is limited.

=== Control tables ===
Control table interpreters can be considered to be, in one sense, "self-modified" by data values extracted from the table entries (rather than specifically hand coded in conditional statements of the form IF inputx = 'yyy').

=== Channel programs ===
Some IBM access methods traditionally used self-modifying channel programs, where a value, such as a disk address, is read into an area referenced by a channel program, where it is used by a later channel command to access the disk.

== History ==
The IBM SSEC, demonstrated in January 1948, had the ability to modify its instructions or otherwise treat them exactly like data. However, the capability was rarely used in practice. In the early days of computers, self-modifying code was often used to reduce use of limited memory, or improve performance, or both. It was also sometimes used to implement subroutine calls and returns when the instruction set only provided simple branching or skipping instructions to vary the control flow. This use is still relevant in certain ultra-RISC architectures, at least theoretically; see for example one-instruction set computer. Donald Knuth's MIX architecture also used self-modifying code to implement subroutine calls.

== Usage ==
Self-modifying code can be used for various purposes:

- Semi-automatic optimizing of a state-dependent loop.
- Dynamic in-place code optimization for speed depending on load environment. (Note: For example, when running on 386 or higher processors, later Novell DOS 7 updates as well as DR-DOS 7.02 and higher will dynamically replace some default sequences of 16-bit REP MOVSW ("copy words") instructions in the kernel's runtime image by 32-bit REP MOVSD ("copy double-words") instructions when copying data from one memory location to another (and half the count of necessary repetitions) in order to speed up disk data transfers. Edge cases such as odd counts are taken care of.)
- Run-time code generation, or specialization of an algorithm in runtime or loadtime (which is popular, for example, in the domain of real-time graphics) such as a general sort utility – preparing code to perform the key comparison described in a specific invocation.
- Altering of inlined state of an object, or simulating the high-level construction of closures.
- Patching of subroutine (pointer) address calling, usually as performed at load/initialization time of dynamic libraries, or else on each invocation, patching the subroutine's internal references to its parameters so as to use their actual addresses (i.e. indirect self-modification).
- Evolutionary computing systems such as neuroevolution, genetic programming and other evolutionary algorithms.
- Hiding of code to prevent reverse engineering (by use of a disassembler or debugger) or to evade detection by virus/spyware scanning software and the like.
- Filling all memory (in some architectures) with a rolling pattern of repeating opcodes, to erase all programs and data, or to burn-in hardware or perform RAM tests.
- Compressing code to be decompressed and executed at runtime, e.g., when memory or disk space is limited.
- Some very limited instruction sets leave no option but to use self-modifying code to perform certain functions. For example, a one-instruction set computer (OISC) machine that uses only the subtract-and-branch-if-negative "instruction" cannot do an indirect copy (something like the equivalent of *a = **b in the C language) without using self-modifying code.
- Booting. Early microcomputers often used self-modifying code in their bootloaders. Since the bootloader was keyed in via the front panel at every power-on, it did not matter if the bootloader modified itself. However, even today many bootstrap loaders are self-relocating, and a few are even self-modifying. (Note: As an example, the DR-DOS MBRs and boot sectors (which also hold the partition table and BIOS Parameter Block, leaving less than 446 respectively 423 bytes for the code) were traditionally able to locate the boot file in the FAT12 or FAT16 file system by themselves and load it into memory as a whole, in contrast to their MS-DOS/PC DOS counterparts, which instead relied on the system files to occupy the first two directory entries in the file system and the first three sectors of IBMBIO.COM to be stored at the start of the data area in contiguous sectors containing a secondary loader to load the remainder of the file into memory (requiring SYS to take care of all these conditions). When FAT32 and LBA support was added, Microsoft even switched to require 386 instructions and split the boot code over two sectors for size reasons, which was not an option for DR-DOS as it would have broken backward- and cross-compatibility with other operating systems in multi-boot and chain load scenarios, as well as with older PCs. Instead, the DR-DOS 7.07 boot sectors resorted to self-modifying code, opcode-level programming in machine language, controlled utilization of (documented) side effects, multi-level data/code overlapping and algorithmic folding techniques to still fit everything into a physical sector of only 512 bytes without giving up any of their extended functionality.)
- Altering instructions for fault-tolerance.

=== Optimizing a state-dependent loop ===
Pseudocode example:

repeat N times {
    if STATE is 1
        increase A by one
    else
        decrease A by one
    do something with A
}

Self-modifying code, in this case, would simply be a matter of rewriting the loop like this:

repeat N times {
    increase A by one
    do something with A
    when STATE has to switch {
        replace the opcode "increase" above with the opcode to decrease, or vice versa
    }
}

Note that two-state replacement of the opcode can be easily written as "xor var at address with the value opcodeOf(Inc) xor opcodeOf(dec)".

Choosing this solution must depend on the value of N and the frequency of state changing.

=== Specialization ===
Suppose a set of statistics such as average, extrema, location of extrema, standard deviation, etc. are to be calculated for some large data set. In a general situation, there may be an option of associating weights with the data, so each x_{i} is associated with a w_{i}, and rather than test for the presence of weights at every index value, there could be two versions of the calculation, one for use with weights and one not, with one test at the start. Now consider a further option, that each value may have associated with it a Boolean to signify whether that value is to be skipped or not. This could be handled by producing four batches of code, one for each permutation and code bloat results. Alternatively, the weight and the skip arrays could be merged into a temporary array (with zero weights for values to be skipped), at the cost of processing and still there is bloat. However, with code modification, to the template for calculating the statistics could be added as appropriate the code for skipping unwanted values, and for applying weights. There would be no repeated testing of the options and the data array would be accessed once, as also would the weight and skip arrays, if involved.

=== Use as camouflage ===
Self-modifying code is more complex to analyze than standard code and can therefore be used as a protection against reverse engineering and software cracking. Self-modifying code was used to hide copy-protection instructions in 1980s disk-based programs for systems such as IBM PC compatibles and Apple II. For example, on an IBM PC, the floppy disk drive access instruction int 0x13 would not appear in the executable program's image but would be written into the executable's memory image after the program started executing.

Self-modifying code is also sometimes used by programs that do not want to reveal their presence, such as computer viruses and some shellcodes. Viruses and shellcodes that use self-modifying code mostly do this in combination with polymorphic code. Modifying a piece of running code is also used in certain attacks, such as buffer overflows.

=== Self-referential machine-learning systems ===
Traditional machine-learning systems have a fixed, pre-programmed learning algorithm to adjust their parameters. However, since the 1980s Jürgen Schmidhuber has published several self-modifying systems with the ability to change their own learning algorithm. They avoid the danger of catastrophic self-rewrites by making sure that self-modifications will survive only if they are useful according to a user-given fitness, error or reward function.

=== Operating systems ===
The Linux kernel notably makes wide use of self-modifying code; it does so to be able to distribute a single binary image for each major architecture (e.g. IA-32, x86-64, 32-bit ARM, ARM64...) while adapting the kernel code in memory during boot depending on the specific CPU model detected, e.g. to be able to take advantage of new CPU instructions or to work around hardware bugs. To a lesser extent, the DR-DOS kernel also optimizes speed-critical sections of itself at loadtime depending on the underlying processor generation.

Regardless, at a meta-level, programs can still modify their own behavior by changing data stored elsewhere (see metaprogramming) or via use of polymorphism.

=== Massalin's Synthesis kernel ===
The Synthesis kernel presented in Alexia Massalin's Ph.D. thesis is a tiny Unix kernel that takes a structured, or even object-oriented, approach to self-modifying code, where code is created for individual quajects, like filehandles. Generating code for specific tasks allows the Synthesis kernel to (as a JIT interpreter might) apply a number of optimizations such as constant folding or common subexpression elimination.

The Synthesis kernel was very fast, but was written entirely in assembly. The resulting lack of portability has prevented Massalin's optimization ideas from being adopted by any production kernel. However, the structure of the techniques suggests that they could be captured by a higher-level language, albeit one more complex than existing mid-level languages. Such a language and compiler could allow development of faster operating systems and applications.

Paul Haeberli and Bruce Karsh have objected to the "marginalization" of self-modifying code, and optimization in general, in favor of reduced development costs.

== Interaction of cache and self-modifying code ==
On architectures without coupled data and instruction cache (for example, some SPARC, ARM, and MIPS cores) the cache synchronization must be explicitly performed by the modifying code (flush data cache and invalidate instruction cache for the modified memory area).

In some cases short sections of self-modifying code execute more slowly on modern processors. This is because a modern processor will usually try to keep blocks of code in its cache memory. Each time the program rewrites a part of itself, the rewritten part must be loaded into the cache again, which results in a slight delay, if the modified codelet shares the same cache line with the modifying code, as is the case when the modified memory address is located within a few bytes to the one of the modifying code.

The cache invalidation issue on modern processors usually means that self-modifying code would still be faster only when the modification will occur rarely, such as in the case of a state switching inside an inner loop.

Most modern processors load the machine code before they execute it, which means that if an instruction that is too near the instruction pointer is modified, the processor will not notice, but instead execute the code as it was before it was modified. See prefetch input queue (PIQ). PC processors must handle self-modifying code correctly for backwards compatibility reasons but they are far from efficient at doing so.

== Security issues ==
Because of the security implications of self-modifying code, all of the major operating systems are careful to remove such vulnerabilities as they become known. The concern is typically not that programs will intentionally modify themselves, but that they could be maliciously changed by an exploit.

One mechanism for preventing malicious code modification is an operating system feature called W^X (for "write xor execute"). This mechanism prohibits a program from making any page of memory both writable and executable. Some systems prevent a writable page from ever being changed to be executable, even if write permission is removed. Other systems provide a "backdoor" of sorts, allowing multiple mappings of a page of memory to have different permissions. A relatively portable way to bypass W^X is to create a file with all permissions, then map the file into memory twice. On Linux, one may use an undocumented SysV shared-memory flag to get executable shared memory without needing to create a file.

== Advantages ==
- Fast paths can be established for a program's execution, reducing some otherwise repetitive conditional branches.
- Self-modifying code can improve algorithmic efficiency.

== Disadvantages ==
Self-modifying code is harder to read and maintain because the instructions in the source program listing are not necessarily the instructions that will be executed. Self-modification that consists of substitution of function pointers might not be as cryptic, if it is clear that the names of functions to be called are placeholders for functions to be identified later.

Self-modifying code can be rewritten as code that tests a flag and branches to alternative sequences based on the outcome of the test, but self-modifying code typically runs faster.

Self-modifying code conflicts with authentication of the code and may require exceptions to policies requiring that all code running on a system be signed.

Modified code must be stored separately from its original form, conflicting with memory management solutions that normally discard the code in RAM and reload it from the executable file as needed.

On modern processors with an instruction pipeline, code that modifies itself frequently may run more slowly, if it modifies instructions that the processor has already read from memory into the pipeline. On some such processors, the only way to ensure that the modified instructions are executed correctly is to flush the pipeline and reread many instructions.

Self-modifying code cannot be used at all in some environments, such as the following:

- Application software running under an operating system with strict W^X security cannot execute instructions in pages it is allowed to write to—only the operating system is allowed to both write instructions to memory and later execute those instructions.
- Many Harvard architecture microcontrollers cannot execute instructions in read-write memory, but only instructions in memory that it cannot write to, ROM or non-self-programmable flash memory.
- A multithreaded application may have several threads executing the same section of self-modifying code, possibly resulting in computation errors and application failures.

== See also ==
- Overlapping code
- Polymorphic code
- Polymorphic engine
- Persistent data structure
- AARD code
- Algorithmic efficiency
- Code as data
- eval statement
- IBM 1130 (Example)
- Just-in-time compilation: This technique can often give users many of the benefits of self-modifying code (except memory size) without the disadvantages.
- Dynamic dead-code elimination
- Homoiconicity
- PCASTL
- Quine (computing)
- Self-replication
- Reflective programming
- Monkey patch: a modification to runtime code that does not affect a program's original source code
- Extensible programming: a programming paradigm in which a programming language can modify its own syntax
- Self-modifying computer virus
- Self-hosting
- Synthetic programming
- Compiler bootstrapping
- Patchable microcode
