= GingerMaster =

Android platform based malware

GingerMaster is malware that affects Android operating system version 2.3. It was first detected in August 2011.

== History ==
GingerMaster is Android malware that contains a root exploit packaged within an infected app. GingerMaster's Root exploit is the "KillingInTheNameOfGingerBreakzegRush"

== Process ==
GingerMaster appears to be a normal application on the user's phone, but once the application is launched on an Android device, it acquires root privileges through GingerBreak on the device and then accesses sensitive data. Once GingerMaster has root access it will try to install a root shell for future malicious use.

== Function ==
GingerMaster steals data such as:

- SIM card number
- Phone number
- IMEI number
- IMSI number
- Screen resolution
- Native time

== See also ==
- Brain Test
- Dendroid (Malware)
- Computer virus
- File binder
- Individual mobility
- Malware
- Trojan horse (computing)
- Worm (computing)
- Mobile operating system
