= Ikee =

iOS computer worm that spread by SSH between jailbroken iPhones

Ikee was a worm that spread by Secure Shell connections between jailbroken iPhones. It was discovered in 2009 and changed wallpapers to a photo of Rick Astley. The code from Ikee was later used to make a more malicious iPhone malware, called Duh.

== History ==
iPhone owners of Australia reported that smart phones had been infected by a worm that changed their iPhone wallpaper to Rick Astley, a 1980s pop singer. It affected smartphones if the owner did not change their default password after installation of SSH. Once the Ikee worm infected, it would find other iPhones on the mobile network which were vulnerable and infect them as well. The worm wouldn't affect users who hadn't jailbroken or installed SSH on their iPhone. The worm does nothing more than changing the infected user's lock screen wallpaper. The source code of the ikee worm says it was written by Ikex.

Two weeks after the release of Ikee, a malicious worm dubbed "Duh", built off the code of Ikee, was discovered. it acted as a Botnet, communicating with a command and control center. it also attempted to steal banking data from ING Direct.

== See also ==
- Brain Test
- Dendroid (malware)
- File binder
- Individual mobility
- Trojan horse (computing)
