= Mobile phone feature =

Mobile phone capability or application

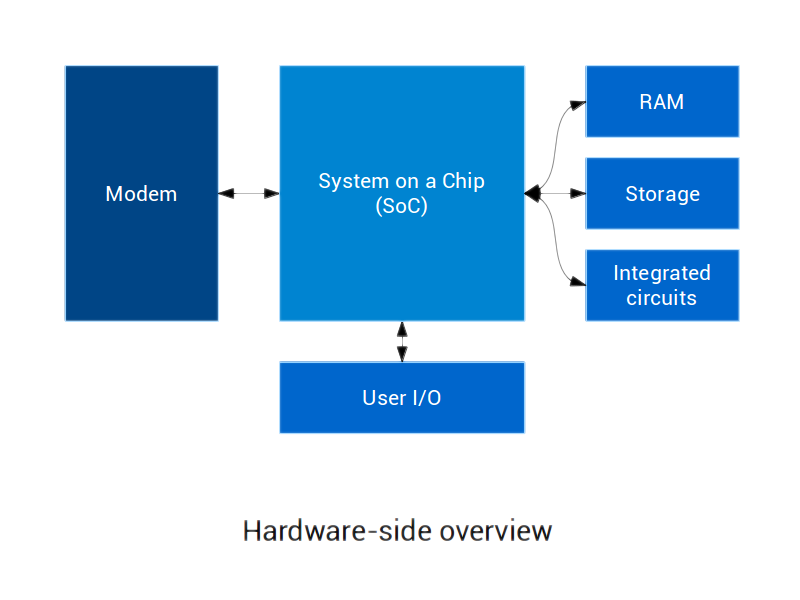
Hardware-side view of a typical smartphone

A mobile phone feature is a capability, service, or application that a mobile phone offers to its users. With the advent of feature phones, mobile phones gained a wider range of features.

The common components found on all phones are:

- A number of metal–oxide–semiconductor (MOS) integrated circuit (IC) chips.
- A battery (typically a lithium-ion battery), providing the power source for the phone functions.
- An input mechanism to allow the user to interact with the phone. The most common input mechanism is a keypad, but touch screens are also found in smartphones.
- Basic 0758995183 to allow users to make calls and send text messages.
- All GSM phones use a SIM card to allow an account to be swapped among devices. Some CDMA devices also have a similar card called a R-UIM.
- Individual GSM, WCDMA, IDEN and some satellite phone devices are uniquely identified by an International Mobile Equipment Identity (IMEI) number.

All mobile phones are designed to work on cellular networks and contain a standard set of services that allow phones of different types and in different countries to communicate with each other. However, they can also support other features added by various manufacturers over the years:

- roaming which permits the same phone to be used in multiple countries, providing that the operators of both countries have a roaming agreement.
- send and receive data and faxes (if a computer is attached), access WAP services, and provide full Internet access using technologies such as GPRS.
- applications like a clock, alarm, calendar, contacts, and calculator and a few games.
- Sending and receiving pictures and videos (without internet) through MMS, and for short distances with e.g. Bluetooth.
- In Multimedia phones Bluetooth is commonly but important Feature.
- GPS receivers integrated or connected (i.e. using Bluetooth) to cell phones, primarily to aid in dispatching emergency responders and road tow truck services. This feature is generally referred to as E911.
- Push to Talk over Cellular, available on some mobile phones, is a feature that allows the user to be heard only while the talk button is held, similar to a walkie-talkie.
- A hardware notification LED on some phones.

== MOS integrated circuit chips ==
A typical smartphone contains a number of metal–oxide–semiconductor (MOS) integrated circuit (IC) chips, which in turn contain billions of tiny MOS field-effect transistors (MOSFETs). A typical smartphone contains the following MOS IC chips.

- Application processor (CMOS system-on-a-chip)
- Flash memory (floating-gate MOS memory)
- Cellular modem (baseband RF CMOS)
- RF transceiver (RF CMOS)
- Phone camera image sensor (CMOS image sensor)
- Power management integrated circuit (power MOSFETs)
- Display driver (LCD or LED driver)
- Wireless communication chips (Wi-Fi, Bluetooth, GPS receiver)
- Sound chip (audio codec and power amplifier)
- Gyroscope
- Capacitive touchscreen controller (ASIC and DSP)
- RF power amplifier (LDMOS)

== User interface ==
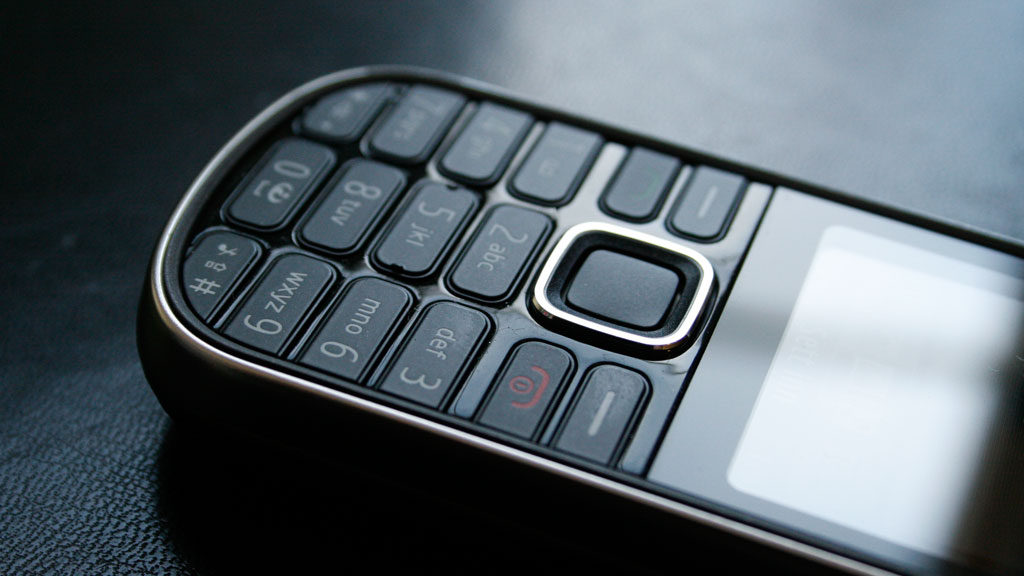
Key pad of a Nokia 3720

Besides the number keypad and buttons for accepting and declining calls (typically from left to right and coloured green and red respectively), button mobile phones commonly feature two option keys, one to the left and one to the right, and a four-directional D-pad which may feature a center button which acts in resemblance to an "Enter" and "OK" button.

A pushable scroll wheel has been implemented in the 1990s on the Nokia 7110.

== Software, applications and services ==
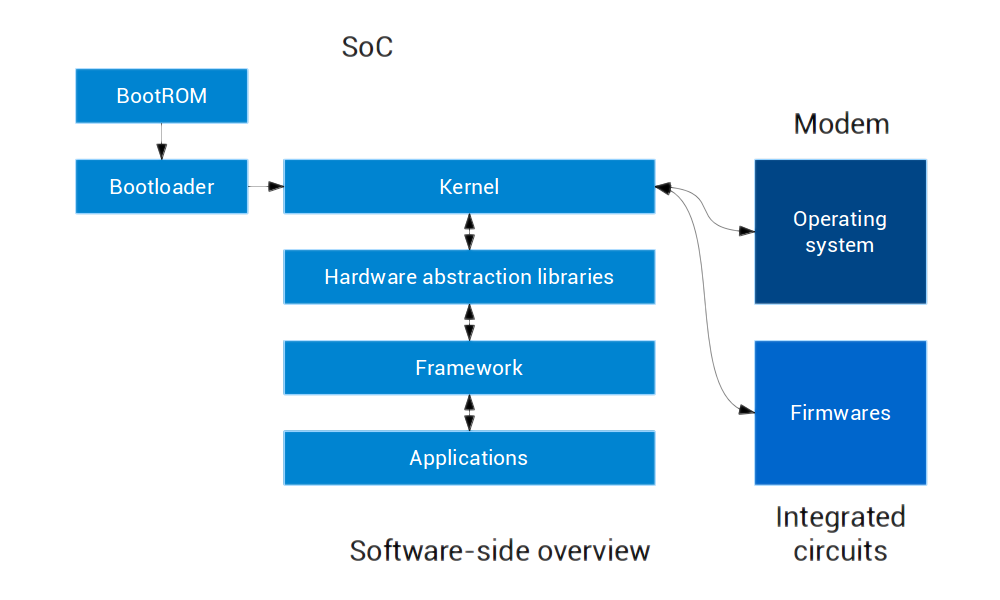
Software-side view of a typical smartphone

In early stages, every mobile phone company had its own user interface, which can be considered as "closed" operating system, since there was a minimal configurability. A limited variety of basic applications (usually games, accessories like calculator or conversion tool and so on) was usually included with the phone and those were not available otherwise. Early mobile phones included basic web browser, for reading basic WAP pages. Handhelds (Personal digital assistants like Palm, running Palm OS) were more sophisticated and also included more advanced browser and a touch screen (for use with stylus), but these were not broadly used, comparing to standard phones. Other capabilities like Pulling and Pushing Emails or working with calendar were also made more accessible but it usually required physical (and not wireless) Syncing. BlackBerry 850, an email pager, released January 19, 1999, was the first device to integrate Email.

A major step towards a more "open" mobile OS was the symbian S60 OS, that could be expanded by downloading software (written in C++, java or python), and its appearance was more configurable. In July 2008, Apple introduced its App store, which made downloading mobile applications more accessible. In October 2008, the HTC Dream was the first commercially released device to use the Linux-based Android OS, which was purchased and further developed by Google and the Open Handset Alliance to create an open competitor to other major smartphone platforms of the time (Mainly Symbian operating system, BlackBerry OS, and iOS)-The operating system offered a customizable graphical user interface and a notification system showing a list of recent messages pushed from apps.

The most commonly used data application on mobile phones is SMS text messaging. The first SMS text message was sent from a computer to a mobile phone in 1992 in the UK, while the first person-to-person SMS from phone to phone was sent in Finland in 1993.

The first mobile news service, delivered via SMS, was launched in Finland in 2000. Mobile news services are expanding with many organizations providing "on-demand" news services by SMS. Some also provide "instant" news pushed out by SMS.

Mobile payments were first trialled in Finland in 1998 when two Coca-Cola vending machines in Espoo were enabled to work with SMS payments. Eventually, the idea spread and in 1999 the Philippines launched the first commercial mobile payments systems, on the mobile operators Globe and Smart. Today, mobile payments ranging from mobile banking to mobile credit cards to mobile commerce are very widely used in Asia and Africa, and in selected European markets. Usually, the SMS services utilize short code.

Some network operators have utilized USSD for information, entertainment or finance services (e.g. M-Pesa).

Other non-SMS data services used on mobile phones include mobile music, downloadable logos and pictures, gaming, gambling, adult entertainment and advertising. The first downloadable mobile content was sold to a mobile phone in Finland in 1998, when Radiolinja (now Elisa) introduced the downloadable ringtone service. In 1999, Japanese mobile operator NTT DoCoMo introduced its mobile Internet service, i-Mode, which today is the world's largest mobile Internet service.

Even after the appearance of smartphones, network operators have continued to offer information services, although in some places, those services have become less common.

Power supply

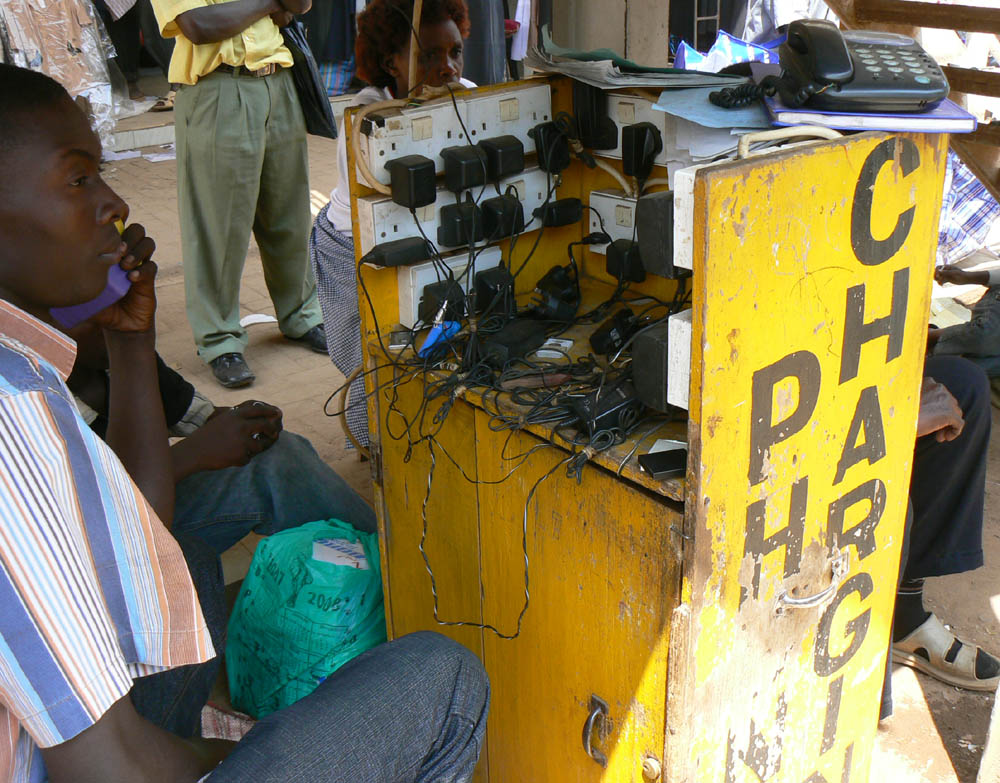
Mobile phone charging service in Uganda

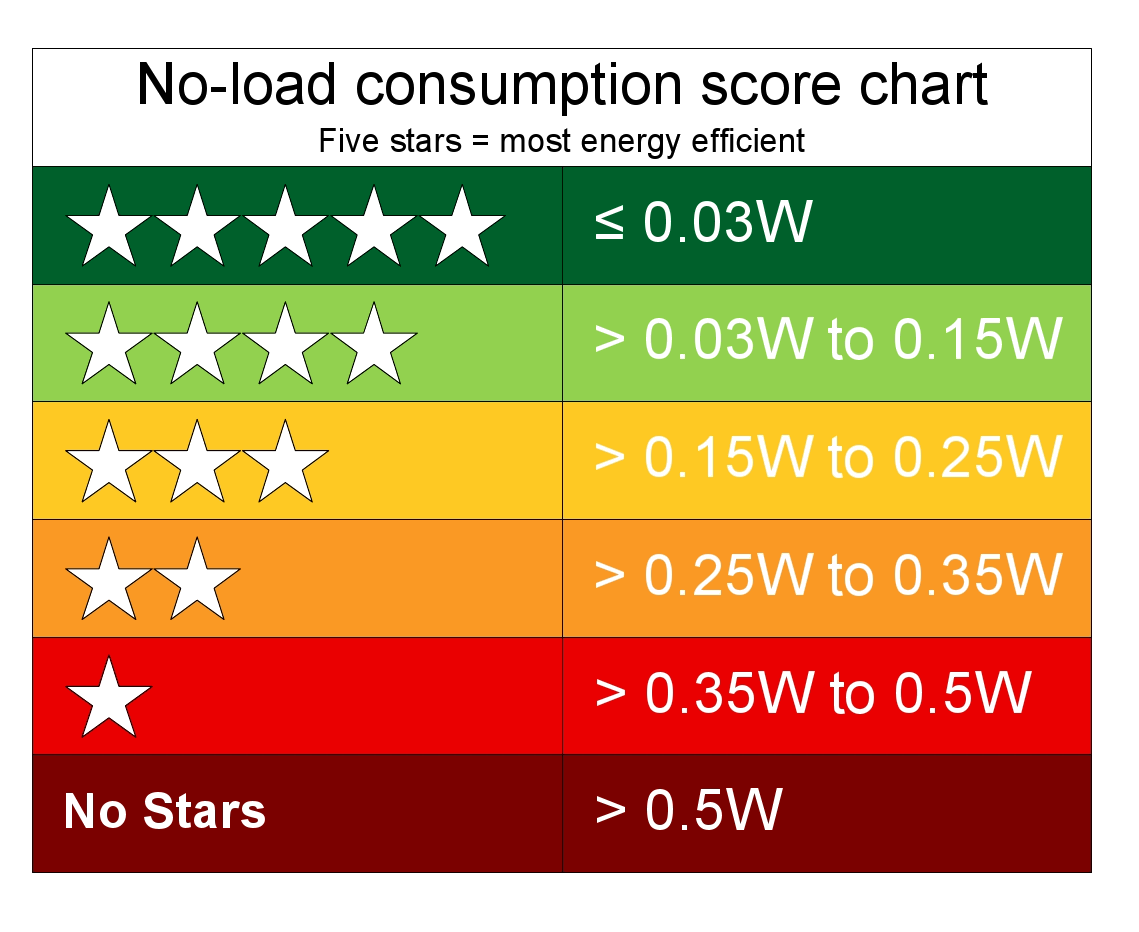
The world's five largest handset makers introduced a new rating system in November 2008 to help consumers more easily identify the most energy-efficient chargers.

Mobile phones generally obtain power from rechargeable batteries. There are a variety of ways used to charge cell phones, including USB, portable batteries, mains power (using an AC adapter), cigarette lighters (using an adapter), or a dynamo. In 2009, the first wireless charger was released for consumer use. Some manufacturers have been experimenting with alternative power sources, including solar cells.

Various initiatives, such as the EU Common External Power Supply have been announced to standardize the interface to the charger, and to promote energy efficiency of mains-operated chargers. A star rating system is promoted by some manufacturers, where the most efficient chargers consume less than 0.03 watts and obtain a five-star rating.

=== Battery ===
Most modern mobile phones use a lithium-ion battery. A popular early mobile phone battery was the nickel metal-hydride (NiMH) type, due to its relatively small size and low weight. Lithium-ion batteries later became commonly used, as they are lighter and do not have the voltage depression due to long-term over-charging that nickel metal-hydride batteries do. Many mobile phone manufacturers use lithium–polymer batteries as opposed to the older lithium-ion, the main advantages being even lower weight and the possibility to make the battery a shape other than strict cuboid.

== SIM card ==
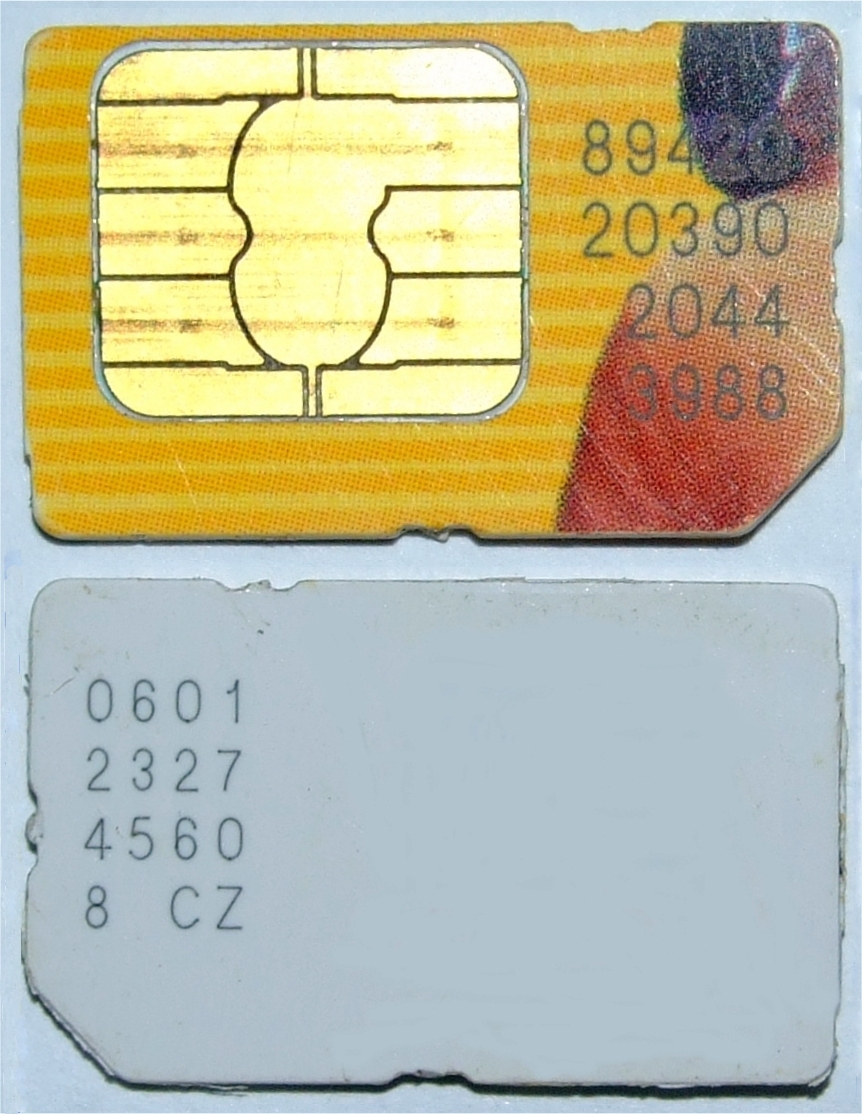
Typical mobile phone with SIM card

GSM mobile phones require a small microchip called a Subscriber Identity Module or SIM card, to function. The SIM card is approximately the size of a small postage stamp and is usually placed underneath the battery in the rear of the unit. The SIM securely stores the service-subscriber key (IMSI) used to identify a subscriber on mobile telephony devices (such as mobile phones and computers). The SIM card allows users to change phones by simply removing the SIM card from one mobile phone and inserting it into another mobile phone or broadband telephony device.

A SIM card contains its unique serial number, internationally unique number of the mobile user (IMSI), security authentication and ciphering information, temporary information related to the local network, a list of the services the user has access to and two passwords (PIN for usual use and PUK for unlocking).

SIM cards are available in three standard sizes. The first is the size of a credit card (85.60 mm × 53.98 mm x 0.76 mm, defined by ISO/IEC 7810 as ID-1). The newer, most popular miniature version has the same thickness but a length of 25 mm and a width of 15 mm (ISO/IEC 7810 ID-000), and has one of its corners truncated (chamfered) to prevent misinsertion. The newest incarnation known as the 3FF or micro-SIM has dimensions of 15 mm × 12 mm. Most cards of the two smaller sizes are supplied as a full-sized card with the smaller card held in place by a few plastic links; it can easily be broken off to be used in a device that uses the smaller SIM.

The first SIM card was made in 1991 by Munich smart card maker Giesecke & Devrient for the Finnish wireless network operator Radiolinja. Giesecke & Devrient sold the first 300 SIM cards to Elisa (ex. Radiolinja).

Those cell phones that do not use a SIM card have the data programmed into their memory. This data is accessed by using a special digit sequence to access the "NAM" as in "Name" or number programming menu. From there, information can be added, including a new number for the phone, new Service Provider numbers, new emergency numbers, new Authentication Key or A-Key code, and a Preferred Roaming List or PRL. However, to prevent the phone being accidentally disabled or removed from the network, the Service Provider typically locks this data with a Master Subsidiary Lock (MSL). The MSL also locks the device to a particular carrier when it is sold as a loss leader.

The MSL applies only to the SIM, so once the contract has expired, the MSL still applies to the SIM. The phone, however, is also initially locked by the manufacturer into the Service Provider's MSL. This lock may be disabled so that the phone can use other Service Providers' SIM cards. Most phones purchased outside the U.S. are unlocked phones because there are numerous Service Providers that are close to one another or have overlapping coverage. The cost to unlock a phone varies but is usually very cheap and is sometimes provided by independent phone vendors.

A similar module called a Removable User Identity Module or RUIM card is present in some CDMA networks, notably in China and Indonesia.

=== Multi-card hybrid phones ===
A hybrid mobile phone can take more than one SIM card, even of different types. The SIM and RUIM cards can be mixed together, and some phones also support three or four SIMs.

From 2010 onwards they became popular in India and Indonesia and other emerging markets, attributed to the desire to obtain the lowest on-net calling rate. In Q3 2011, Nokia shipped 18 million of its low cost dual SIM phone range in an attempt to make up lost ground in the higher end smartphone market.

== Display ==
Mobile phones have a display device, some of which are also touch screens. The screen size varies greatly by model and is usually specified either as width and height in pixels or the diagonal measured in inches.

Some phones have more than one display, for example the Kyocera Echo, an Android smartphone with a dual 3.5 inch screen. The screens can also be combined into a single 4.7 inch tablet style computer.

As of 2026, most new smartphones have a screen size between and including 6.3 inch and 6.9 inch, most have a 20:9 or taller aspect ratio. Smartphones 7 inch or larger and/or 19.5:9 aspect ratio or wider are rare.

== Central processing unit ==
Mobile phones have central processing units (CPUs), similar to those in computers, but optimised to operate in low power environments (typically under ten watts, up to thirty watts after removing safety firmware). In smartphones, the CPU is typically integrated in a system-on-a-chip (SoC) application processor.

Mobile CPU performance depends not only on the clock rate (generally given in multiples of hertz) but also the memory hierarchy also greatly affects overall performance. Because of these problems, the performance of mobile phone CPUs is often more appropriately given by scores derived from various standardized tests to measure the real effective performance in commonly used applications.

== Miscellaneous features ==
Other features that may be found on mobile phones include GPS navigation, music (MP3) and video (MP4) playback, RDS radio receiver, built-in projector, active cooling, vibration and other "silent" ring options, alarms, memo recording, personal digital assistant functions, ability to watch streaming video, video download, video calling, built-in cameras (1.0+ Mpx) and camcorders (video recording), with autofocus and flash, ringtones, games, PTT, memory card reader (SD), USB (2.0), dual line support, infrared, Bluetooth (2.0) and WiFi connectivity, NFC, instant messaging, Internet e-mail and browsing and serving as a wireless modem.

The first smartphone was the Nokia 9000 Communicator in 1996 which added PDA functionality to the basic mobile phone at the time. As miniaturization and increased processing power of microchips has enabled ever more features to be added to phones, the concept of the smartphone has evolved, and what was a high-end smartphone five years ago, is a standard phone today.

Several phone series have been introduced to address a given market segment, such as the RIM BlackBerry focusing on enterprise/corporate customer email needs; the SonyEricsson Walkman series of musicphones and Cybershot series of cameraphones; the Nokia Nseries of multimedia phones, the Palm Pre the HTC Dream and the Apple iPhone.

Nokia and the University of Cambridge demonstrated a bendable cell phone called the Morph. Some phones have an electromechanical transducer on the back which changes the electrical voice signal into mechanical vibrations. The vibrations flow through the cheek bones or forehead allowing the user to hear the conversation. This is useful in the noisy situations or if the user is hard of hearing.

As of 2018, there are smartphones that offer reverse wireless charging.

Cooling

== Multi-mode and multi-band mobile phones ==
Most mobile phone networks are digital and use the GSM, CDMA or iDEN standard which operate at various radio frequencies. These phones can only be used with a service plan from the same company. For example, a Verizon phone cannot be used with a T-Mobile service, and vica versa.

A multi-mode phone operates across different standards whereas a multi-band phone (also known more specifically as dual, tri or quad band) mobile phone is a phone which is designed to work on more than one radio frequency. Some multi-mode phones can operate on analog networks as well (for example, dual band, tri-mode: AMPS 800 / CDMA 800 / CDMA 1900).

For a GSM phone, dual-band usually means 850 / 1900 MHz in the United States and Canada, 900 / 1800 MHz in Europe and most other countries. Tri-band means 850 / 1800 / 1900 MHz or 900 / 1800 / 1900 MHz. Quad-band means 850 / 900 / 1800 / 1900 MHz, also called a world phone, since it can work on any GSM network.

Multi-band phones have been valuable to enable roaming whereas multi-mode phones helped to introduce WCDMA features without customers having to give up the wide coverage of GSM. Almost every single true 3G phone sold is actually a WCDMA/GSM dual-mode mobile. This is also true of 2.75G phones such as those based on CDMA-2000 or EDGE.

=== Challenges in producing multi-mode phones ===
The special challenge involved in producing a multi-mode mobile is in finding ways to share the components between the different standards. The phone keypad and display should be shared, otherwise it would be hard to treat as one phone. Beyond that, though, there are challenges at each level of integration. How difficult these challenges are depends on the differences between systems. When talking about IS-95/GSM multi-mode phones, for example, or AMPS/IS-95 phones, the base band processing is very different from system to system. This leads to real difficulties in component integration and so to larger phones.

An interesting special case of multi-mode phones is the WCDMA/GSM phone. The radio interfaces are very different from each other, but mobile to core network messaging has strong similarities, meaning that software sharing is quite easy. Probably more importantly, the WCDMA air interface has been designed with GSM compatibility in mind. It has a special mode of operation, known as punctured mode, in which, instead of transmitting continuously, the mobile is able to stop sending for a short period and try searching for GSM carriers in the area. This mode allows for safe inter-frequency handovers with channel measurements which can only be approximated using "pilot signals" in other CDMA based systems.

A final interesting case is that of mobiles covering the DS-WCDMA and MC-CDMA 3G variants of the CDMA-2000 protocol. Initially, the chip rate of these phones was incompatible. As part of the negotiations related to patents, it was agreed to use compatible chip rates. This should mean that, despite the fact that the air and system interfaces are quite different, even on a philosophical level, much of the hardware for each system inside a phone should be common with differences being mostly confined to software.

== Data communications ==
Mobile phones are now heavily used for data communications, such as SMS messages, browsing mobile web sites, and even streaming audio and video files. The main limiting factors are the size of the screen, lack of a keyboard, processing power and connection speed. Most cellphones, which support data communications, can be used as wireless modems (via cable or bluetooth), to connect a computer to the internet. Such an access method is slow and expensive, but it can be available in very remote areas.

With newer smartphones, screen resolution and processing power has become bigger and better. Some new phone CPUs run at over 1 GHz. Many complex programs are now available for the various smartphones, such as Symbian and Windows Phone.

Connection speed is based on network support. Originally data transfers over GSM networks were possible only over CSD (circuit switched data), it has bandwidth of 9600 bit/s and usually is billed by connection time (from network point of view, it does not differ much from voice call). Later, there were introduced improved version of CSD – HSCSD (high speed CSD), it could use multiple time slots for downlink, improving speed. Maximum speed for HSCSD is ~42 kbit/s, it also is billed by time. Later was introduced GPRS (general packet radio service), which operates on completely different principle. It also can use multiple time slots for transfer, but it does not tie up radio resources, when not transferring data (as opposed to CSD and like). GPRS usually is prioritized under voice and CSD, so latencies are large and variable. Later, GPRS was upgraded to EDGE, which differs mainly by radio modulation, squeezing more data capacity in same radio bandwidth. GPRS and EDGE usually are billed by data traffic volume. Some phones also feature full Qwerty keyboards, such as the LG enV.

As of April 2006, several models, such as the Nokia 6680, support 3G communications. Such phones have access to the Web via a free download of the Opera web browser. Verizon Wireless models come with Internet Explorer pre-loaded onto the phone.

== Vulnerability to viruses ==
As more complex features are added to phones, they become more vulnerable to viruses which exploit weaknesses in these features. Even text messages can be used in attacks by worms and viruses. Advanced phones capable of e-mail can be susceptible to viruses that can multiply by sending messages through a phone's address book. In some phone models, the USSD was exploited for inducing a factory reset, resulting in clearing the data and resetting the user settings.

A virus may allow unauthorized users to access a phone to find passwords or corporate data stored on the device. Moreover, they can be used to commandeer the phone to make calls or send messages at the owner's expense.

Mobile phones used to have proprietary operating system unique only to the manufacturer which had the beneficial effect of making it harder to design a mass attack. However, the rise of software platforms and operating systems shared by many manufacturers such as Java, Microsoft operating systems, Linux, or Symbian OS, may increase the spread of viruses in the future.

Bluetooth is a feature now found in many higher-end phones, and the virus Caribe hijacked this function, making Bluetooth phones infect other Bluetooth phones running the Symbian OS. In early November 2004, several web sites began offering a specific piece of software promising ringtones and screensavers for certain phones. Those who downloaded the software found that it turned each icon on the phone's screen into a skull-and-crossbones and disabled their phones, so they could no longer send or receive text messages or access contact lists or calendars. The virus has since been dubbed "Skulls" by security experts. The Commwarrior-A virus was identified in March 2005, and it attempts to replicate itself through MMS to others on the phone's contact list. Like Cabir, Commwarrior-A also tries to communicate via Bluetooth wireless connections with other devices, which can eventually lead to draining the battery. The virus requires user intervention for propagation however.

Bluetooth phones are also subject to bluejacking, which although not a virus, does allow for the transmission of unwanted messages from anonymous Bluetooth users.

USB-C (controller) hack.

== Cameras ==
Most current phones also have a built-in digital camera (see camera phone), up to 200 megapixels (SoC supports 320 megapixel HDR photos), 8K video at 30fps (4K at 120fps, 1080p at 480fps). This gives rise to some concern about privacy, in view of possible voyeurism, for example in swimming pools. South Korea has ordered manufacturers to ensure that all new handsets emit a beep whenever a picture is taken.

Sound recording and video recording is often also possible. Most people do not walk around with a video camera, but do carry a phone. The arrival of video camera phones is transforming the availability of video to consumers, and helps fuel citizen journalism.

== See also ==
- Mobile game
- Ringtone
- Smartphone
- Mobile phone form factor
- Wallpaper
