= Cabir =

Cabir may refer to:

- Cabeiri
- Cabir (computer worm), an early Mobile virus
