= Hummingbad =

Android Malware, discovered in February 2016

HummingBad is Android malware created by Chinese advertising company, Yingmob. It was discovered by Check Point in February 2016.

Researchers from Check Point said the malware installs more than 50,000 fraudulent apps each day, displays 20 million malicious advertisements, and generates more than $300,000 per month in revenue. The research pointed out the Yingmob group, previously accused of being responsible for the Yispecter iOS malware, as being responsible for the attack.

The malware infected more than 10 million Android devices worldwide, most of which were located in China and India and were running outdated versions of Android.

== See also ==
- Botnet
- Brain Test
- Computer virus
- Dendroid (Malware)
- File binder
- Individual mobility
- Malware
- Mobile operating system
- Trojan horse (computing)
- Worm (computing)
- Zombie (computer science)
