= Transport hub =

Place where passengers and cargo are exchanged

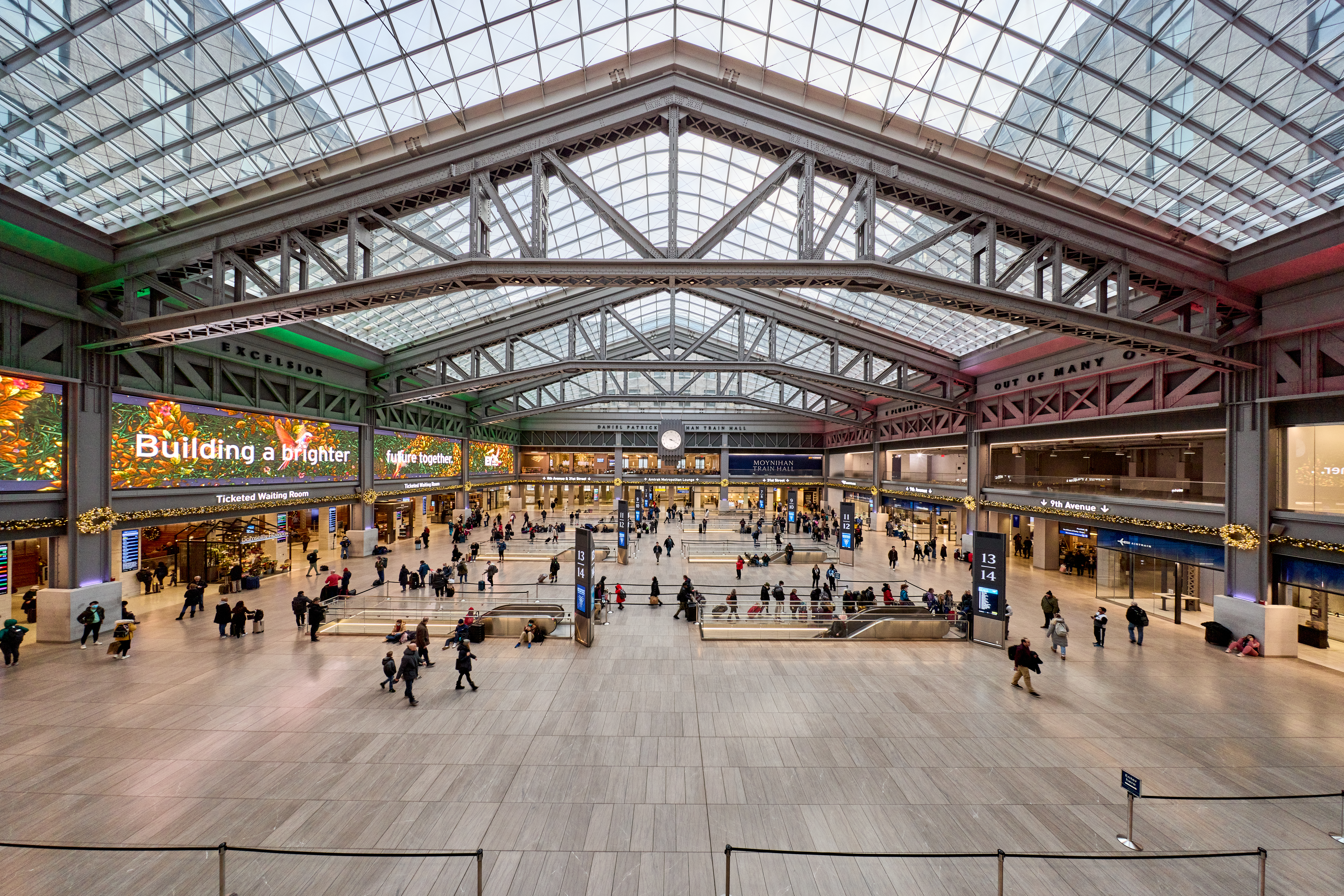
Penn Station in Midtown Manhattan, New York City, the busiest transportation hub in the Western Hemisphere

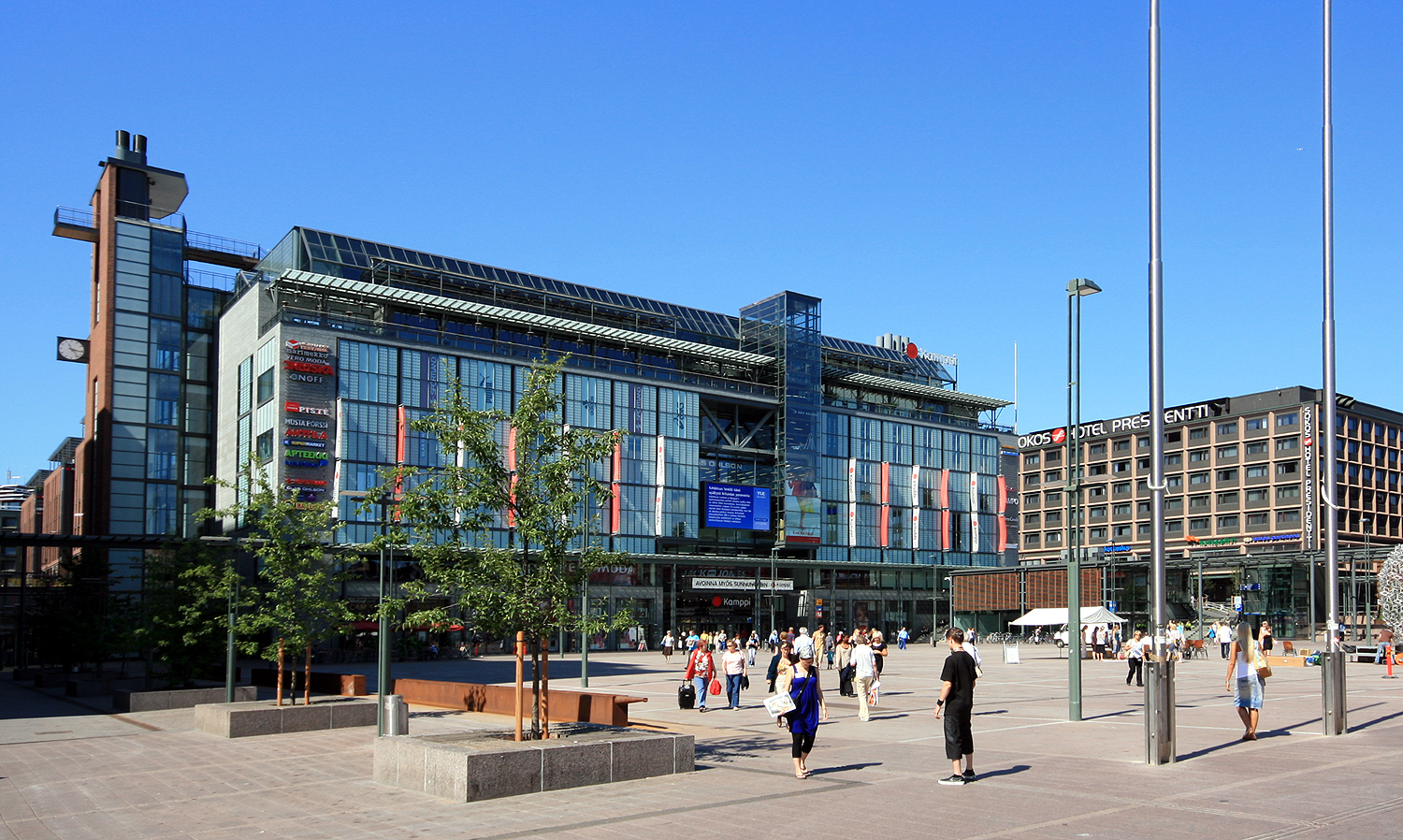
Underground bus and coach terminal and metro station are located underneath the Kamppi Center in Helsinki, Finland

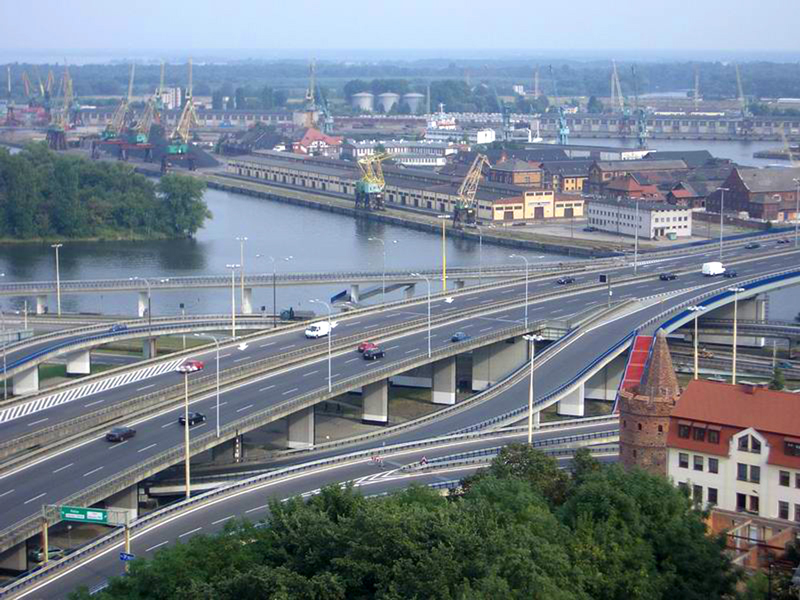
Szczecin: Port of Szczecin, motorway, expressway and railway connections, an inter-city public transport, a city bus and electric trams network and "Solidarity" Szczecin–Goleniów Airport, Poland

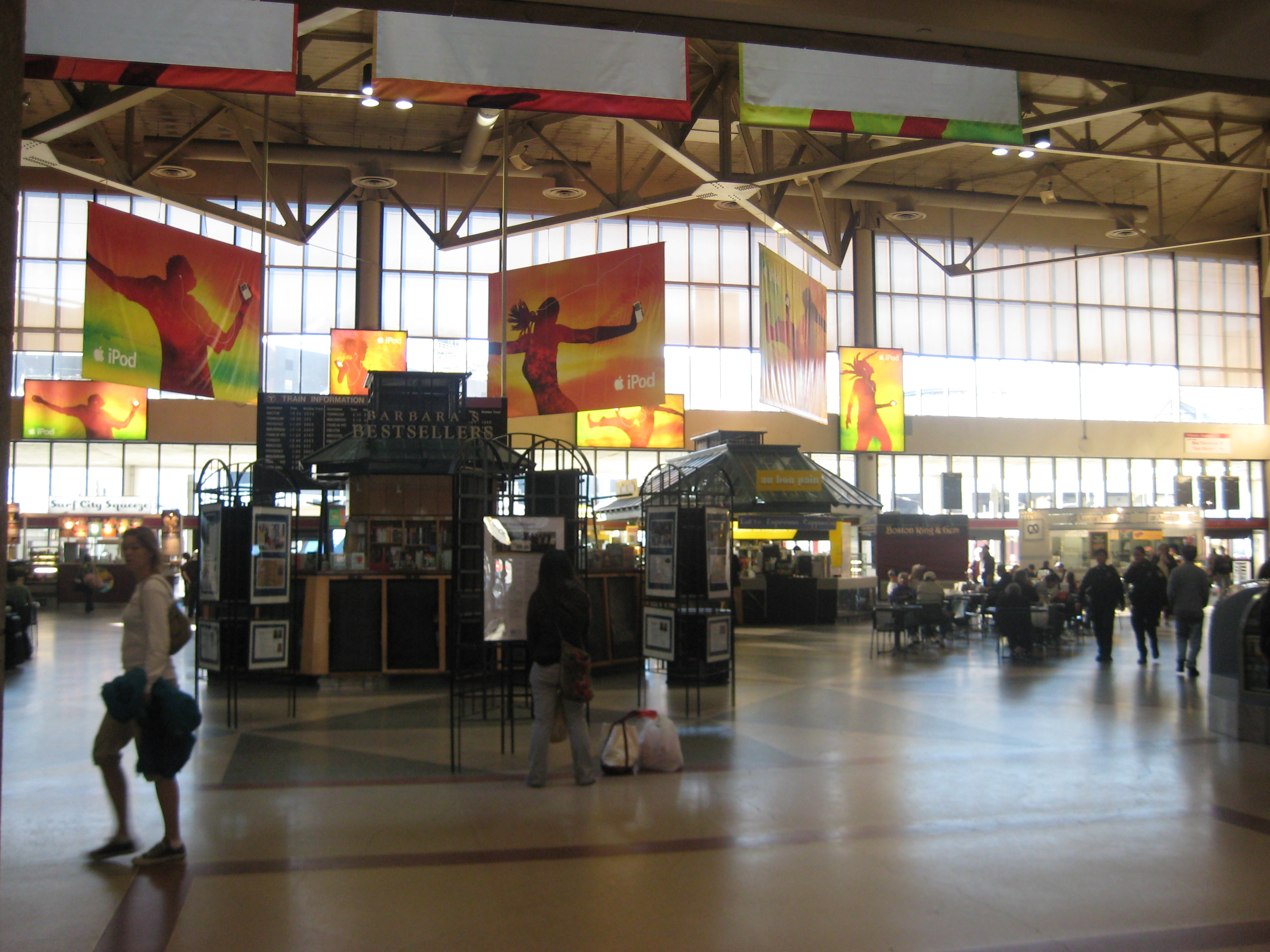
South Station, an MBTA, Amtrak, and Greyhound transportation hub in Boston, Massachusetts, United States

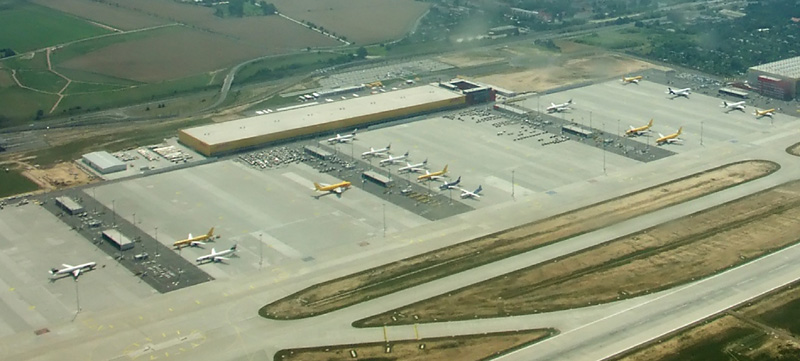
DHL hub Leipzig/Halle Airport, Germany

A transport hub is a place where passengers and cargo are exchanged between vehicles and/or between transport modes. Public transport hubs include railway stations, rapid transit stations, bus stops, tram stops, airports, and ferry slips.

Freight hubs include classification yards, airports, inland ports, seaports, and truck terminals, or combinations of these.

For private transport by car, the parking lot functions as an unimodal hub.

== History ==
Historically, an interchange service in the scheduled passenger air transport industry involved a "through plane" flight operated by two or more airlines where a single aircraft was used with the individual airlines operating it with their own flight crews on their respective portions of a direct, no-change-of-plane multi-stop flight. In the U.S., a number of air carriers including Alaska Airlines, American Airlines, Braniff International Airways, Continental Airlines, Delta Air Lines, Eastern Airlines, Frontier Airlines (1950–1986), Hughes Airwest, National Airlines (1934–1980), Pan Am, Trans World Airlines (TWA), United Airlines and Western Airlines previously operated such cooperative "through plane" interchange flights on both domestic and/or international services with these schedules appearing in their respective system timetables.

Delta Air Lines pioneered the hub and spoke system for aviation in 1955 from its hub in Atlanta, Georgia, United States, in an effort to compete with Eastern Air Lines. FedEx adopted the hub and spoke model for overnight package delivery during the 1970s. When the United States airline industry was deregulated in 1978, Delta's hub and spoke paradigm was adopted by several airlines. Many airlines around the world operate hub-and-spoke systems facilitating passenger connections between their respective flights.

== Public transport ==
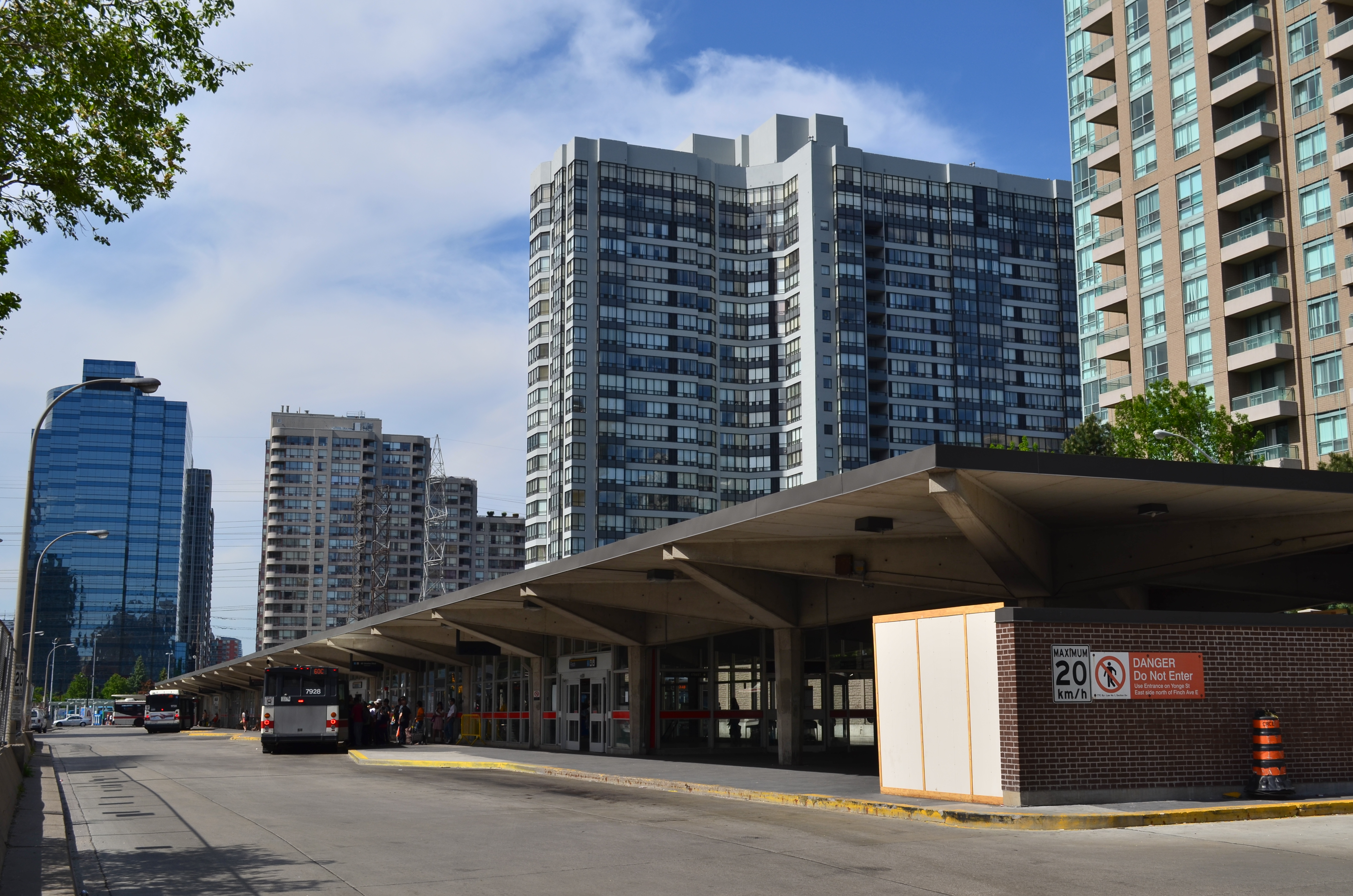
In suburban Toronto, Finch Station connects underground train, local, regional, and interregional bus services.

Intermodal passenger transport hubs in public transport include bus stations, railway stations and metro stations, while a major transport hub, often multimodal (bus and rail), may be referred to as a transport centre or, in American English, as a transit center. Sections of city streets that are devoted to functioning as transit hubs are referred to as transit malls. In cities with a central station, that station often also functions as a transport hub in addition to being a railway station. An example of a transport centre is London King's Cross railway station, with multiple London Underground lines, InterCity trains and lots of London Buses.

Journey planning involving transport hubs is more complicated than direct trips, as journeys will typically require a transfer at the hub. Modern electronic journey planners for public transport have a digital representation of both the stops and transport hubs in a network, to allow them to calculate journeys that include transfers at hubs.

=== Mobility hubs ===
Many passenger transport hubs are designed as moblity hubs, designed to encourage multimodal passenger transport combining various forms of public and personal transportation, and often integrating mobility as a service schemes. Within transport planning, mobility hubs are closely associated with land use and transport interactions (LUTI).

== Airports ==
Airports have a twofold hub function. First, they concentrate passenger traffic into one place for onward transportation. This makes it important for airports to be connected to the surrounding transport infrastructure, including roads, bus services, and railway and rapid transit systems. Secondly some airports function as intra-modular hubs for the airlines, or airline hubs. This is a common strategy among network airlines who fly only from limited number of airports and usually will make their customers change planes at one of their hubs if they want to get between two cities the airline does not fly directly between.

Airlines have extended the hub-and-spoke model in various ways. One method is to create additional hubs on a regional basis, and to create major routes between the hubs. This reduces the need to travel long distances between nodes that are close together. Another method is to use focus cities to implement point-to-point service for high traffic routes, bypassing the hub entirely.

== Freight ==
There are usually three kinds of freight hubs: water-road, water-rail (inland ports or seaports), and road-rail. There can also be water-road-rail. With the growth of containerization, intermodal freight transport has become more efficient, often making multiple legs cheaper than through services—increasing the use of hubs.

== See also ==
- Central station
- Infrastructure security
- Intermodal journey planner
- Junction (traffic)
- Layover
- Spoke-hub distribution paradigm
- Transit desert
- Transit mall
