= FRJ =

FRJ may refer to:

- Federal Republic of Yugoslavia (Serbian: Savezna Republika Jugoslavija), 1992–2003
- Formula Regional Japanese Championship (FRJ championship), a Formula 3 regional racing league
- Afrijet Airlines, a defunct Nigerian airline, by ICAO airline code
- Frejus Airport, a former airport in France, by IATA airport code

== See also ==
- FRJ-2 nuclear research reactor
- frjj (Furong Jiejie; born 1977) internet celebrity
