= Furong =

Furong (unless otherwise noted, Chinese: 芙蓉; lit. 'hibiscus mutabilis') may refer to:

== Locations ==
Districts

- Furong District, Changsha, Hunan

Towns

- Furong, Yongshun County, Hunan, renamed following the film Hibiscus Town
- Furong, Jiangxi, subdivision of Wan'an County, Jiangxi
- Furong, Fuxin (富荣镇), subdivision of Fuxin Mongol Autonomous County, Liaoning
- Furong, Pingshan (富荣镇), subdivision of Pingshan County, Sichuan
- Furong, Zhejiang, subdivision of Yueqing, Zhejiang

Other places

- Furong Mountain, a mountain in Ningxiang, Hunan, China
- Furong River, a tributary of the Wu River in Southwest China
- Furong Cave, in Wulong District, Chongqing
- Furong, the Chinese name of Seremban, Malaysia

== Other uses ==
- Furong dan, or Egg foo young, an omelette dish found in UK and American Chinese cuisine
- Sister Furong (born 1977), nickname of Shi Hengxia, a woman who received worldwide notoriety in 2005 for her postings on the Internet
- Furong Daokai (1043–1118), Chinese Zen Buddhist monk
- Hibiscus Town, 1986 Chinese film directed by Xie Jin
