= BlogCN =

Chinese company

- Website type: blog hosting service
- Available in: Chinese
- Website: www.blogcn.com
- Commercial: Yes
- Launched: November 2002; 23 years ago

BlogCN was the first free blog hosting service provider in China. It was established in November 2002. Based in the eastern city of Hangzhou, BlogCN has built the world's largest Chinese blog community, blog hosting service, and blog search engine. The Internet portal offers free blog space, but began to charge for value-added services, including mobile phone features, in 2005. BlogCN simultaneously introduced a virtual coin system to purchase such services. The total value of BlogCN was estimated at US$10,000,000. 70-80% of its revenue comes from advertising. The website was supported by Web 2.0 software.

== Notable bloggers ==
The company first came into the public's attention in 2003 because of its blogger Mu Zimei. Her blog contained straightforward descriptions of her sexual encounters with various men, which was a first for China. Zhiguang Hu, the founder and now director of BlogCN, was featured in an article in the August 24, 2005 issue of BusinessWeek entitled A Watchful Eye on China's Blogosphere.
