= Push-to-talk =

Protocol in half-duplex telecommunication devices

Push-to-talk (PTT), also known as press-to-transmit, is a method of having conversations or talking on half-duplex communication lines, including two-way radio, using a momentary button to switch from voice reception mode to transmit mode.

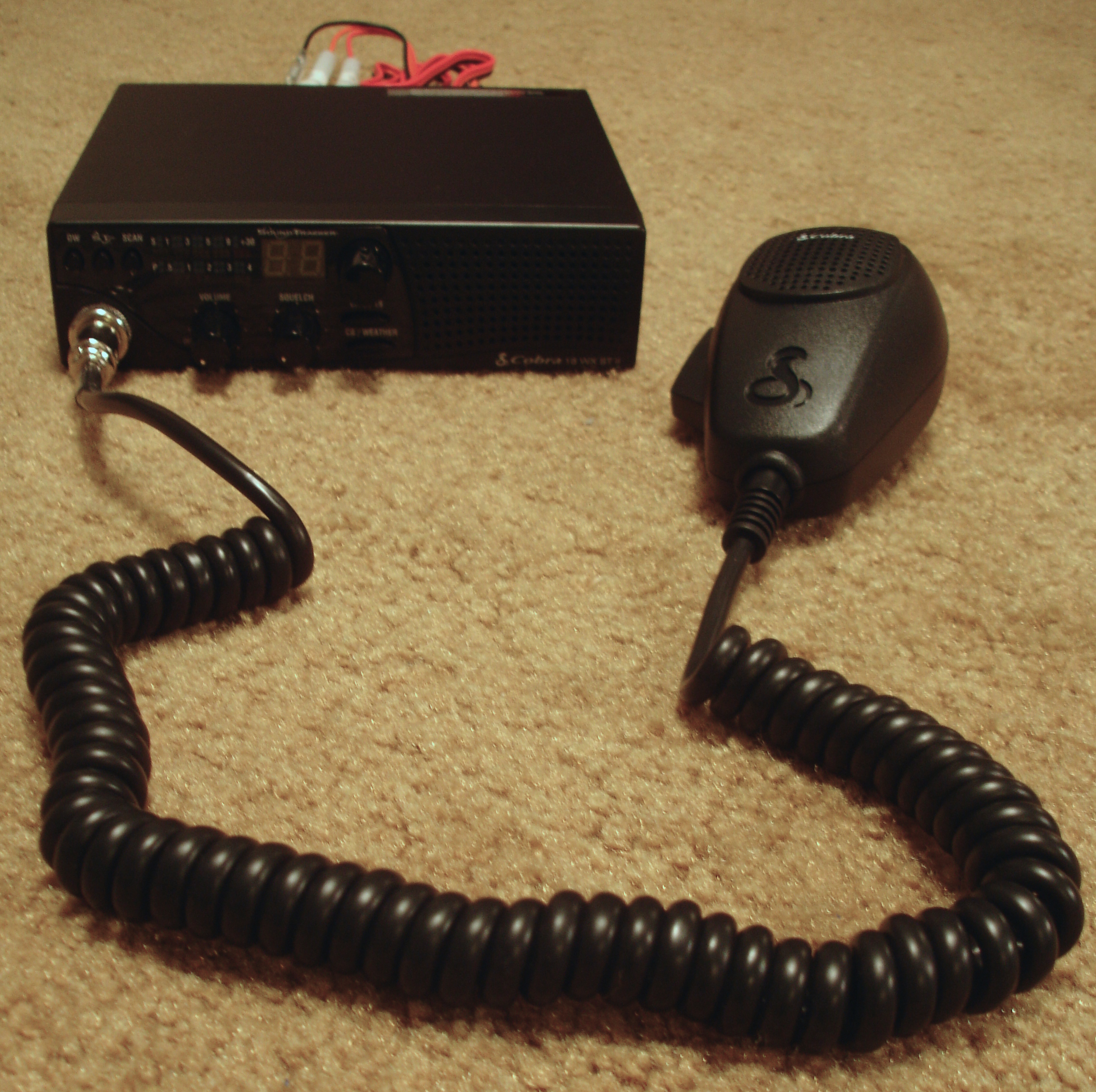
CB radio with push-to-talk microphone switch

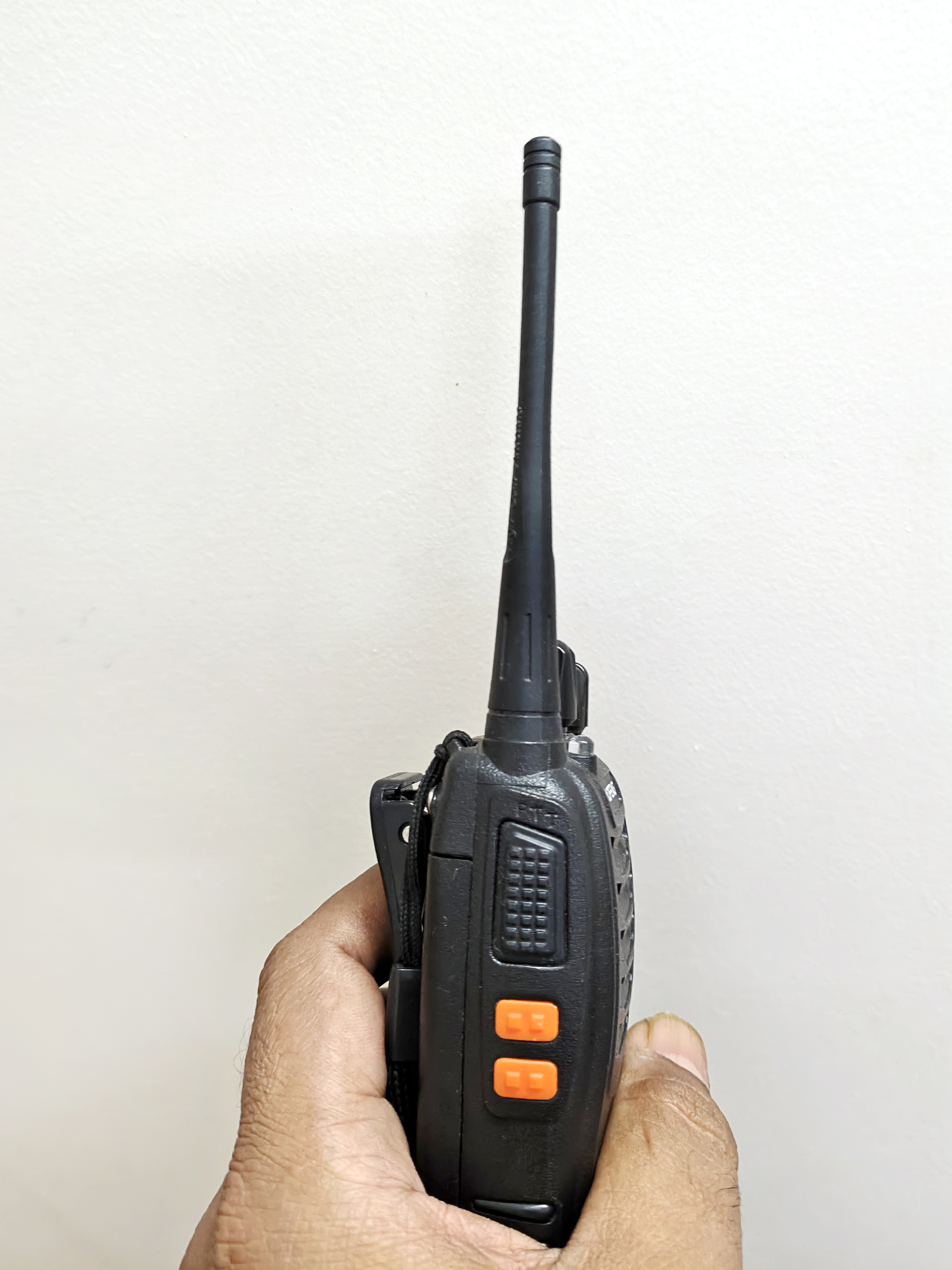
5W Radio PTT Switch

== History ==
For example, an air traffic controller usually supervises several aircraft and talks on one radio frequency to all of them. Those under the same frequency can hear others' transmissions while using procedure words such as "break", "break break" to separate order during the conversation (ICAO doc 9432). In doing so, they are aware of each other's actions and intentions. Unlike in a conference call, they do not hear background noise from the ones who are not speaking. Similar considerations apply to police radio, the use of business band radios on construction sites, and other scenarios requiring coordination of several parties. Citizens Band is another example of classic push-to-talk operation.

The PTT switch is most commonly located on the radio's handheld microphone, or for small hand-held radios, directly on the radio. For heavy radio users, a PTT foot switch may be used, and also can be combined with either a boom-mounted microphone or a headset with integrated microphone.

Less commonly, a separate hand-held PTT switch may be used. This type of switch was historically called a pressel.

In situations where a user may be too busy to handle a talk switch, voice operated switches are sometimes employed. Some systems use PTT ID to identify the speaker.

== Mobile phones ==
Push-to-talk over cellular (PTToC) is a service option for a cellular phone network that enables subscribers to use their phones as walkie-talkies with unlimited range. A typical push-to-talk connection connects almost instantly. A significant advantage of PTT is the ability for a single person to reach an active talk group with a single button press; users don't need to make several telephone calls to coordinate with a group.

Push-to-talk cellular calls similarly provide half-duplex communications – while one person transmits, the other(s) receive. This combines the operational advantages of PTT with the interference resistance and other virtues of mobile phones. Manufacturers of (POC or PoC) hardware include ToooAir and Hytera US Inc.

Mobile push-to-talk services, offered by some mobile carriers directly as well as by independent companies, adds PTT functionality to smartphones and specialized mobile handsets (hand portable and mobile/base station PTT Radio Terminals). In addition to mobile handsets, some services also work on a laptop, desktop, and tablet computers.

== Smartphone and computer apps ==
Recent development in PTT communications is the appearance of apps on smartphones, some of which can function on multiple platforms. Wireless carrier-grade PTT systems have adapted to and adopted the smartphone platform by providing downloadable apps that support their PTT systems across many mobile platforms. Over-the-top (OTT) applications do not depend on a specific carrier or type of communication network, and may be slower than carrier implementations.

== See also ==
- OMA Instant Messaging and Presence Service
- Push-to-type operation – Telegraphy
- Click-to-call – Web-based communication
