= Muzi Mei =

Chinese journalist and blogger

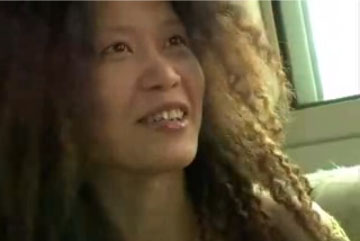
- Muzi Mei
- Born: Li Li; 1978 (age 47–48)
- Education: Sun Yat-sen University

Muzi Mei (Chinese: 木子美; pinyin: Mùzǐ Měi; born 1978) is a journalist and blogger from Guangzhou, China, who became an Internet celebrity in late 2003. Her blog contained frank descriptions of her sexual encounters with various men, which is believed to be a first for China.

== Life ==
Her real name is Li Li (pinyin: Lǐ Lì)—"Muzi" (木子) becomes "Li" (李) when the characters are arranged vertically, and "Mei" (美) and "Li" (麗) are synonyms (both mean "beautiful"). She studied in the Department of Philosophy in Sun Yat-sen University in Guangzhou, and graduated in 2001.

She formerly worked as a journalist.

== Media coverage ==
In 2003 she was the topic of heated discussion and controversy in print media, bulletin boards and Internet chatrooms across China, and was even mentioned in stories in The New York Times, TIME (December 12, 2005, European edition. Vol. 166, No. 24, page 31) and The Washington Post and other international media. Her name was often mentioned together with Tang Jiali, a dancer who was the first to publish a book of nude artistic photographs of herself. This reflected a partial liberalization of restrictions on sexual material and nudity in Chinese publications beginning in 2003.

Portions of her blog have been translated into French and published as a book with the title Journal sexuel d'une jeune Chinoise sur le net (Éditions Albin Michel, 2005, ISBN 2-226-15980-0). A German translation is published as Mein intimes Tagebuch (Aufbau-Verlag, January 2007, ISBN 3-7466-2306-5).

Muzi Mei was featured in an article in the December 12, 2005 issue of Time Magazine entitled "Sex, Please—We're Young and Chinese".

Bokee.com has hired her to promote the concept of blogging. She has shifted to podcasting. According to the Sydney Morning Herald, "One [2005] podcast was an hour-long sound track of an amorous encounter, starting with 'Please come in' and finishing in climactic groans, panting and shrieking. It gets about 10,000 visits a day."

== See also ==
- BlogCN
- Internet censorship in China
- Sister Furong
