= Push-to-type operation =

Telegraphy

Push-to-type operation: In telegraph or data transmission systems, that method of communication in which the operator at a station must keep a switch operated in order to send messages.

Push-to-type operation is used in radio systems where the same frequency is employed for transmission and reception.

Push-to-type operation is a derivative form of transmission and may be used in simplex, half-duplex, or duplex operation. Synonym press-to-type operation.

This is similar to Push-to-talk operation for radio phone communications.
