= Private transport =

Private vehicles or commercial fleets optionally carrying passengers or freight

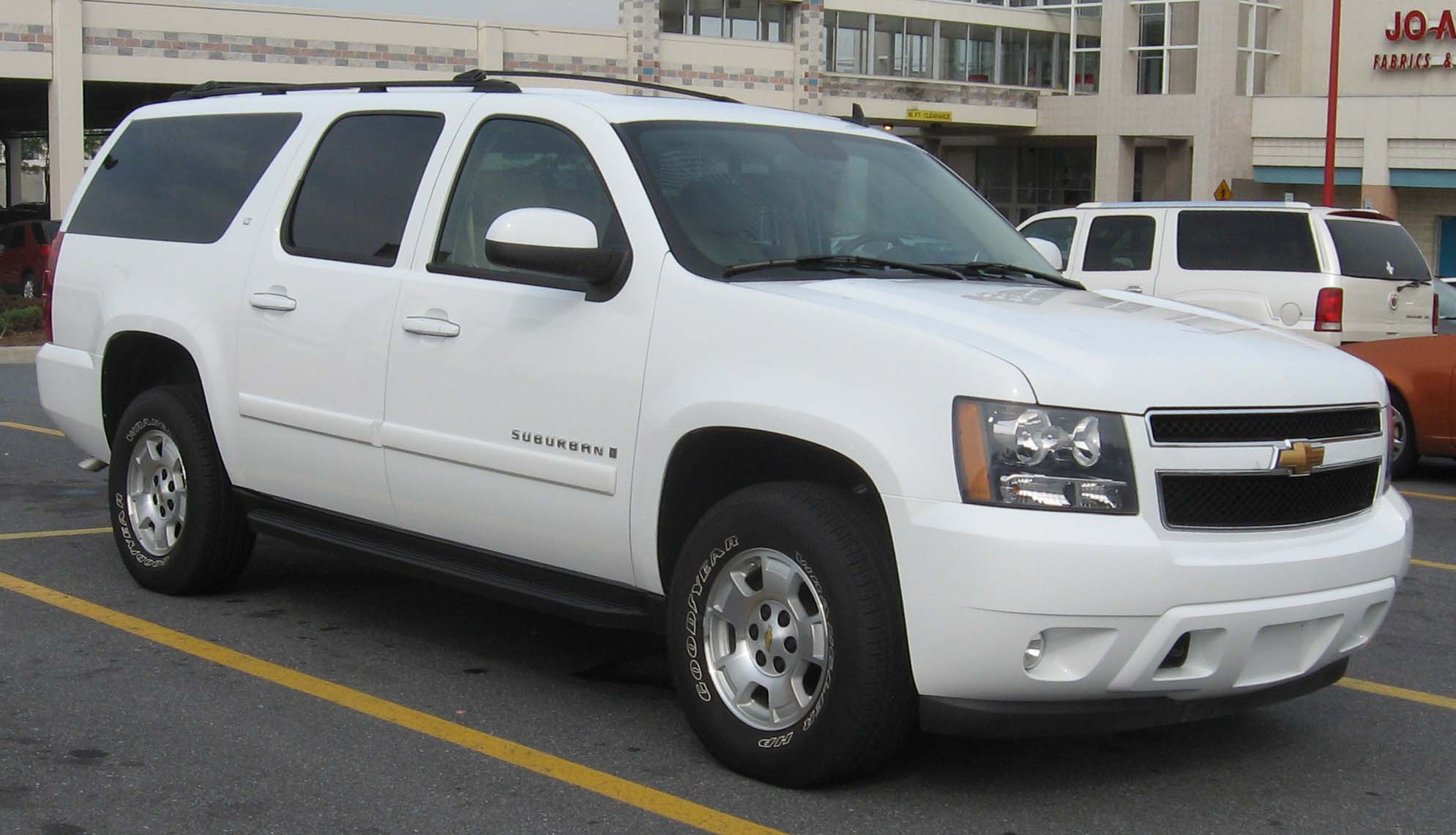
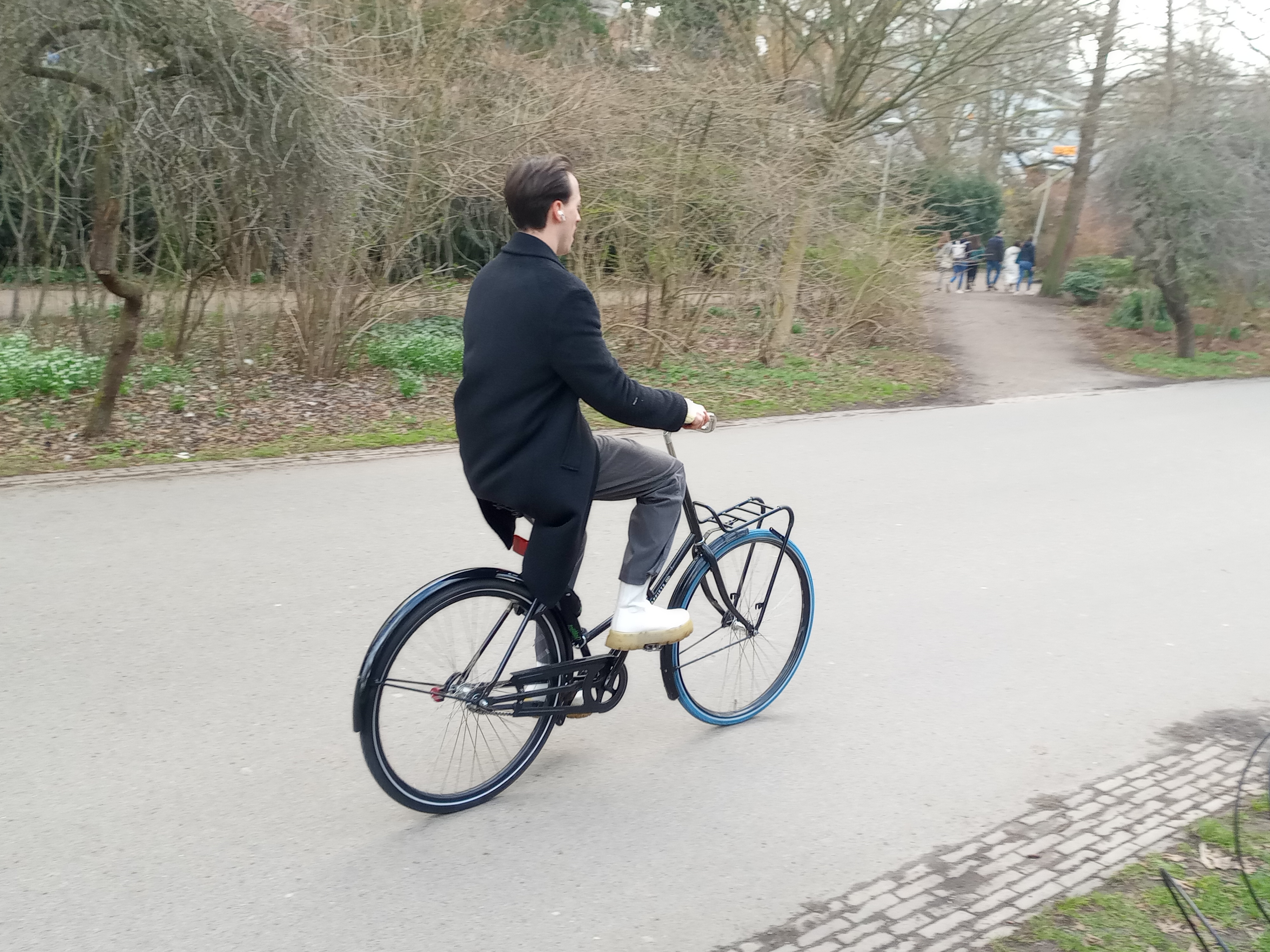
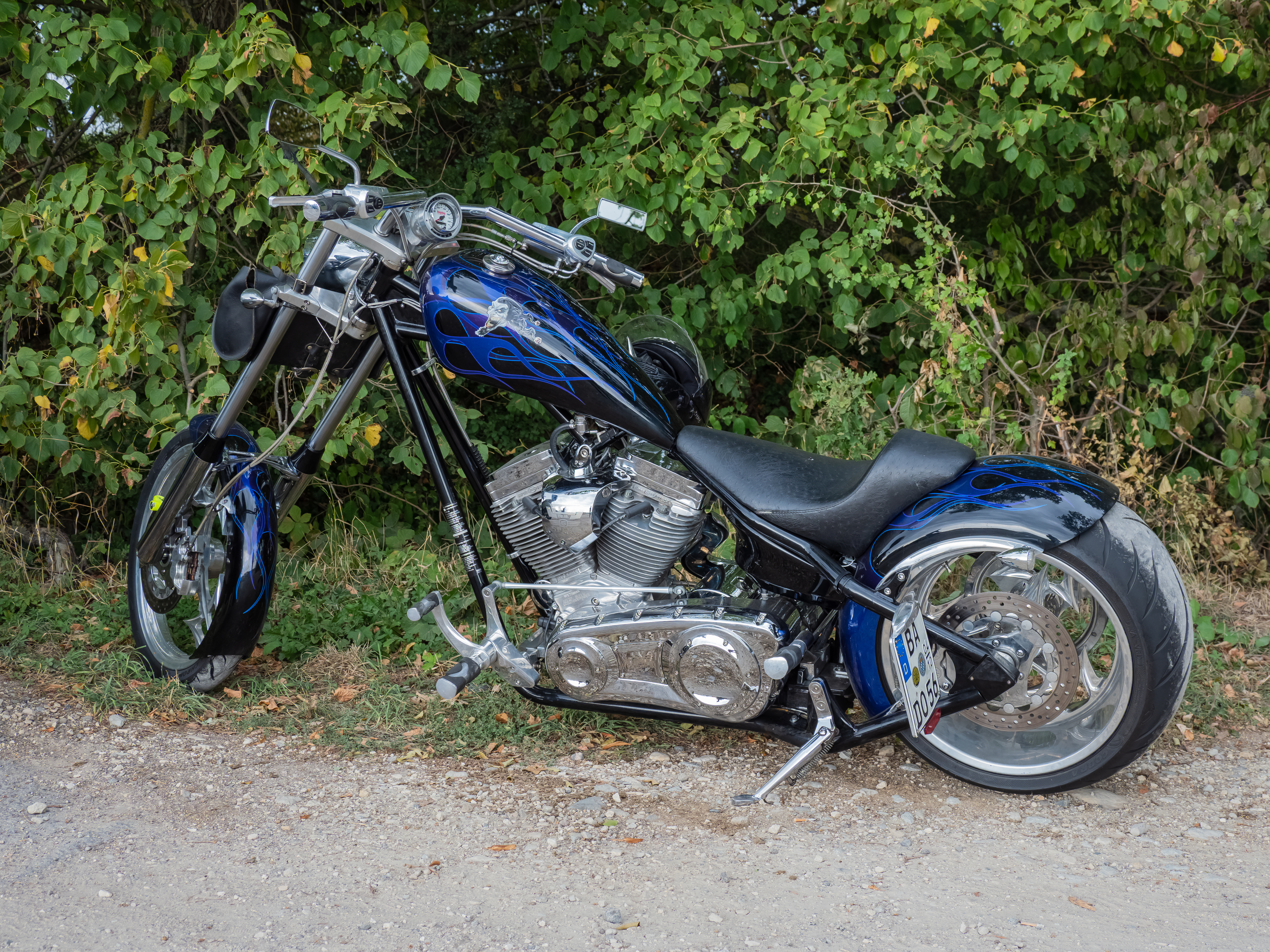
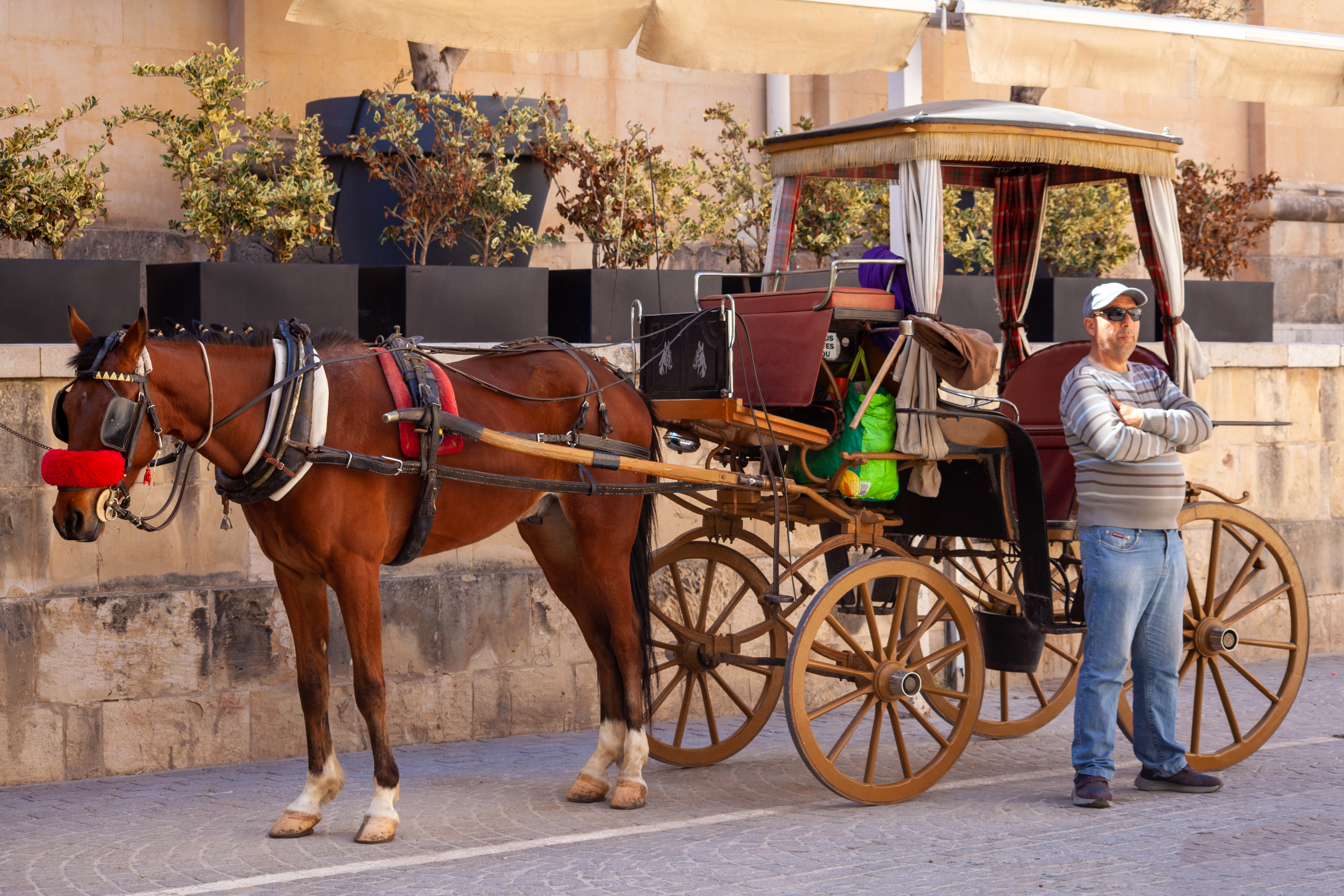
Examples of types of private transport. Clockwise from top left: An automobile (SUV) in the United States, a bicycle in the Netherlands, a horse-drawn carriage in Malta, and a motorcycle in Germany.

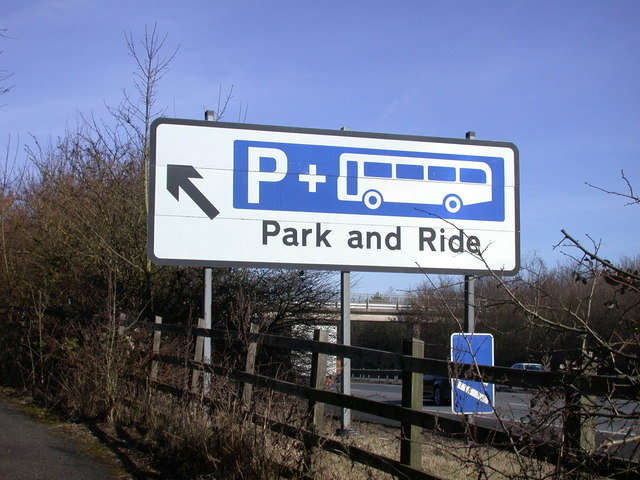
A park and ride sign in the United Kingdom, for people heading into a city centre to transfer between private and public transport

Private transport (as opposed to public transport) is the personal or individual use of transportation which are not available for use by the general public, where in theory the user can decide freely on the time and route of transit ('choice rider' vs. 'captive rider'), using vehicles such as: private car, company car, bicycle, dicycle, self-balancing scooter, motorcycle, scooter, aircraft, boat, snowmobile, carriage, horse, etc., or recreational equipment such as roller skates, inline skates, sailboat, sailplane, skateboard etc.

== Definition ==
Private transport is in contrast to public transport, and commercial non-public transport. While private transportation may be used alongside nearly all modes of public transportation, private railroad cars are rare (e.g. royal train), although heritage railways are not. Unlike many forms of public transportation, which may be government subsidized or operated by privately owned commercial organizations for mass or general public use, the entire cost of private transportation is born directly or indirectly by the individual user(s). However some scholars argue that it is inaccurate to say that the costs are covered by individual user because big (and often dominant) part of cost of private transportation is the cost of infrastructure on which individual trips rely. They therefore work also with model of quasi-private mobility.

=== Personal transport ===
Private transportation includes both non-motorized methods of private transit (pedestrians, cyclists, skaters, etc.) and all forms of self-propelled transport vehicles.

==== Shared personal transport ====
Non-public passenger transport in vehicles owned by the driver or passenger or operated by the driver.

=== Commercial transport ===
==== Shared vehicle fleets without driver ====
Self driven transport in vehicles not owned by either the passengers or driver.

==== Shared vehicle fleets with driver ====
Non-scheduled transit vehicles, taxicabs and rickshaws, which are rented or hired in the short-term on-demand with driver, belong, even if the user can freely decide on the time and route of transit, to the special forms of 'public transport'.

==== Shared individual vehicle journeys ====
Means of transport are fixed route and fixed schedule passenger services, for example, excursion riverboats, tourist cable cars, resort ski lifts.

== Usage ==
Private transport is the dominant form of transportation in most of the world. In the United States, for example, 86.2% of passenger miles are by passenger vehicles, motorcycles, and trucks.

== Examples of private transport ==
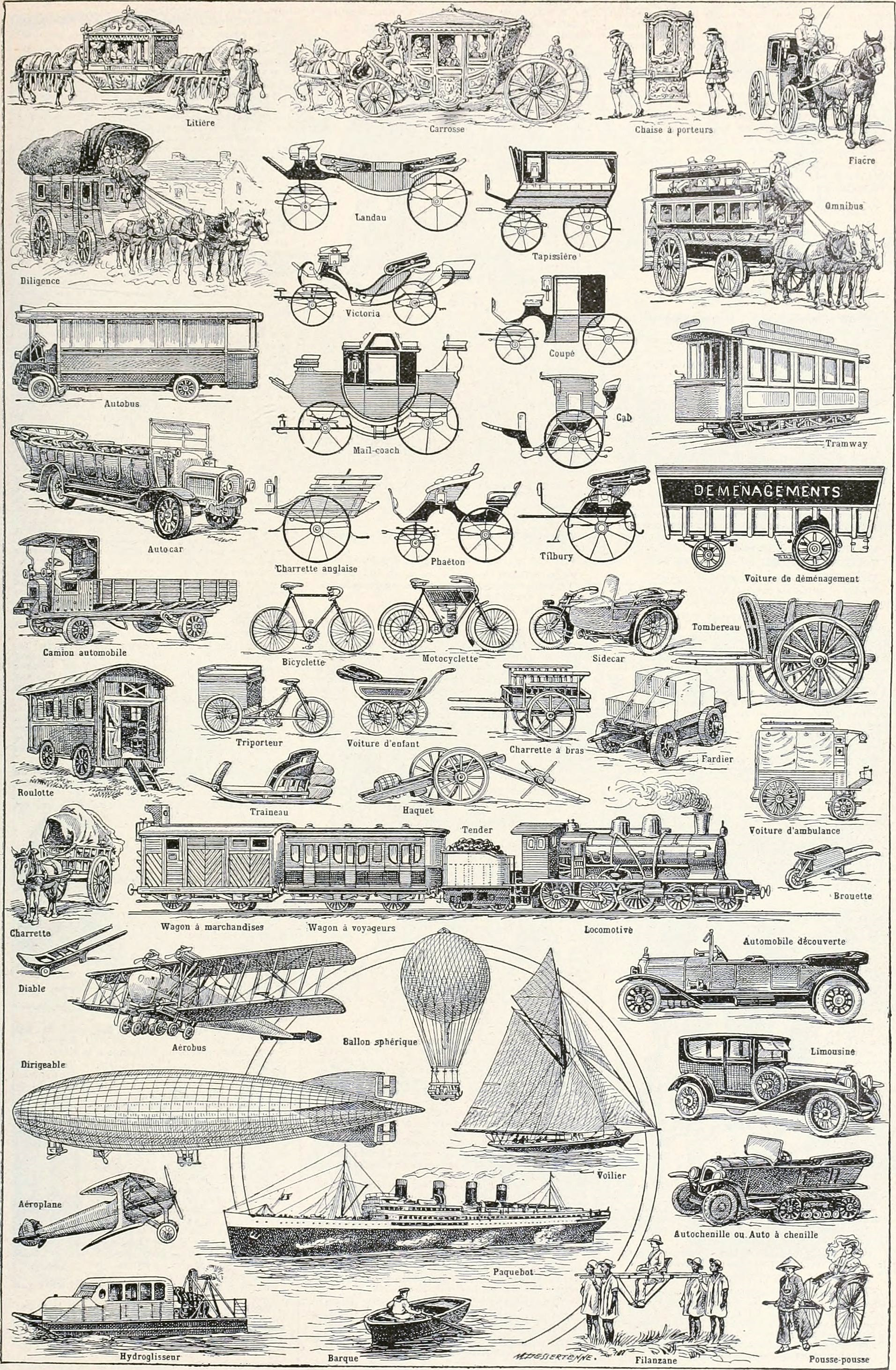
1922 illustration. Private transport depicted; automobile, bicycle, biplane, caravan, coupe, cabriolet, half-track, horse-drawn carriage, horse-drawn cart, hot-air balloon, rowing boat, limousine, motorcycle, truck, wheelbarrow, yacht. Public transport depicted; ambulance, charabanc, horsecar, mailcoach, motorbus, rickshaw, stagecoach, steam locomotive, streetcar

- Motorized:
  - Automobile
  - Motorboat
  - Electric bicycle
  - Electric skateboard
  - Hovercraft
  - Moped
  - Motorcycle
  - Motorized wheelchair
  - Private aviation
  - Private jet
  - Motor ship
  - Submarine
  - Electric scooter
  - Electric unicycle
  - Mobility scooter
  - SUV
  - Pick-up truck
  - Limousine
- Non-motorized:
  - Bicycle
  - Horse-drawn vehicle
  - Hot air balloon
  - Ice skates
  - Inline skates
  - Pack animal
  - Roller skates
  - Scooter
  - Skateboard
  - Walking
  - Wheelchair

== Sustainability ==
Cycling and walking, above all, have been recognized as the most sustainable transport systems. In general, all muscle-driven mobility will have a similar energy efficiency while at the same time being almost emission-free (apart from the CO_{2} exhaled during breathing).

The negative environmental impact of private transport can be alleviated by choosing the optimal modal share for a given environment and transport requirements.

== Dedicated infrastructure ==
- Automobile repair shop
- Controlled-access highway
- Diner
- Drive-thru
- Drive-in theater
- Filling station
- Garage (residential)
- Motel
- Parking lot
- Rest area
- Retail park
- Roadside zoo
- Safari park
- Roads
- Racetrack (Cars)
- Car Dealership
- Tollbooth
- Park and ride

== See also ==
- Auto rickshaw
- Air travel
- Chauffeur
- Taxicab
- Ridesharing company
- Vehicle for hire
- Peak car
- Car sharing
- Hitchhiking
- Mobilities
  - Individual mobility
- Personal rapid transit
