= PTT ID =

PTT ID, or Push-To-Talk ID, is a generic term for an automatic number identification (ANI)-like system used in two-way radio systems. It provides identification of the transmitting radio over the air, and is commonly used in selective calling/signaling systems, usually in commercial and public safety radio systems.

PTT ID features are included in MDC-1200 and other signaling systems.
