= PoC radio =

Push to talk over cellular radio

- Other name: PTToC radio
- Type: PoC device
- Core function: Push-to-talk
- Introduced by: TYT
- Communication mode: half-duplex

A PoC radio (short for push to talk over cellular radio), also known as PTToC radio, is an instant communication device that is based on the cellular network. It is a radio device that incorporates push-to-talk technology into a cellular radio handset. It allows users to communicate with one or more receivers instantly, in a half-duplex mode.

Although a PoC radio is a walkie-talkie-like device, there are substantial differences between them. Compared to the latter, the former has a wider range of channels, covers a wider area, and does not require a license to transmit. In addition, a PoC radio supports advanced functions, such as, video calls, multimedia messages, GPS location tracking, and emergency notifications.

PoC radios are widely used in private security, logistics, hospitality, and rescue. The representative manufacturers of such equipment include Hytera and ToooAir. Mission-critical PTToC (MCPTT) is also starting to be employed in sectors such as public safety, transportation, and utilities.

== Technology ==
PoC radios combine the immediate, one-to-many communication interface of a classic two-way radio (including a dedicated physical PTT button) with the wide-area infrastructure of cellular networks, thus, devices require an active mobile data connection via a SIM card, eSIM, or Wi-Fi network.

Voice signals are digitized, compressed into IP packets, and transmitted over cellular data networks to a central application server, which instantly broadcasts the audio stream to all active members of an assigned talkgroup.

Devices range from ultra-rugged, screenless handheld units and vehicle-mounted terminals running embedded Linux or Android OS, to commercial smartphones running enterprise PTT software applications.

== History ==
The concept of PoC was introduced by U.S. telecommunications company Nextel in 1987. The first commercial use of PoC radios was also started by the company in 2002.

In June 2005, the Open Mobile Alliance rolled out an approved standard called "PoC 1.0". In April 2020, Hytera presented a PoC radio named PNC550, equipped with a 5-inch touchscreen that supports full operation using gloves.
