= Sister Furong =

Chinese blogger

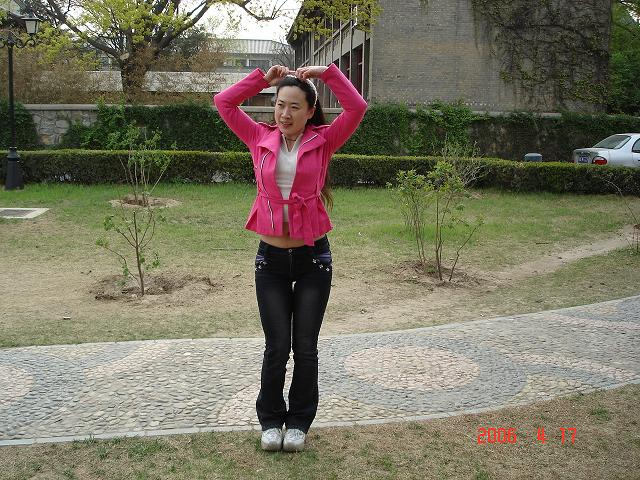
Sister Furong

Shi Hengxia (simplified Chinese: 史恒侠; traditional Chinese: 史恆俠; pinyin: Shǐ Héngxiá; born 1977), better known by her nickname Sister Furong, is a woman from Wugong County, Shaanxi Province, China who received widespread attention in 2005 for her postings on the Internet.

Shi Hengxia is also referred to as frjj, short for "Furong Jiejie", which translates to "Sister Lotus".

== Name ==
Shi Hengxia is better known by her nickname, Fúróng Jiějiě (芙蓉姐姐) in Chinese, which could be translated partially as Sister Furong or fully as Sister Lotus (Flower) or Sister (cotton-rose) Hibiscus (Flower) in English. "'芙蓉' is the Chinese name for a flower which has always been used to describe young beauty."

== Commentary ==
In Celebrity in China, Ian Roberts writes:

On a basic level, Furong Jiejie is just an unremarkable young Chinese woman...It is by writing about herself in a self-indulgent fashion on the internet – capitalising on her success – that she sets herself apart from the crowd, creating ongoing curiosity in her activities.

The content Furong publishes on her blog has been described in The Independent as "saucy self-portraits and delusional diary entries."

== Government response ==
In July 2005, authorities told the country's top blog host to move Furong-related content to low-profile parts of the site.

== See also ==
- Honglaowai
- Muzi Mei
- Papi Jiang
- Sister Feng
- William Hung
