= Commwarrior =

Mobile phone malware

Malware details
- Alias: Symb/Comwar-A
- Type: Symbian Bluetooth Worm
- Subtype: Nokia Series 60 infecter
- Classification: Mobile phone virus

Commwarrior is a Symbian Bluetooth worm that was the first to spread via Multimedia Messaging Service (MMS) and Bluetooth. The worm affects only the Nokia Series 60 software platform.

== Infection ==
Commwarrior was particularly effective via the MMS vector it used to infect other phones. It appeared as though it had been sent from a source that was known to the victim, leading even security-conscious users to open the infected message. Actually, the message was sent at random to a contact in the sender's address book. Once the message is opened, the virus attempts to install itself on the phone via a SIS file. As it runs, the worm is executed every time the phone is switched on.

A secondary method of infection is to create a malicious .SIS file on a compromised phone. Once per minute thereafter, the worm attempts to send this file to any phone that has Bluetooth enabled.

== Symptoms ==
According to Sophos, during installation the program has a one in six chance of displaying the following text: "CommWarrior v1.0 (c) 2005 by e10d0r"
