= Individual mobility =

How humans move within a network

Individual mobility is the study that describes how individual humans move within a network or system. The concept has been studied in a number of fields originating in the study of demographics. Understanding human mobility has many applications in diverse areas, including spread of diseases, mobile viruses, city planning, traffic engineering, financial market forecasting, and nowcasting of economic well-being.

== Data ==
In recent years, there has been a surge in large data sets available on human movements. These data sets are usually obtained from cell phone or GPS data, with varying degrees of accuracy. For example, cell phone data is usually recorded whenever a call or a text message has been made or received by the user, and contains the location of the tower that the phone has connected to as well as the time stamp. In urban areas, user and the telecommunication tower might be only a few hundred meters away from each other, while in rural areas this distance might well be in region of a few kilometers. Therefore, there is varying degree of accuracy when it comes to locating a person using cell phone data. These datasets are anonymized by the phone companies so as to hide and protect the identity of actual users. As example of its usage, researchers used the trajectory of 100,000 cell phone users within a period of six months, while in much larger scale trajectories of three million cell phone users were analyzed. GPS data are usually much more accurate even though they usually are, because of privacy concerns, much harder to acquire. Massive amounts of GPS data describing human mobility are produced, for example, by on-board GPS devices on private vehicles. The GPS device automatically turns on when the vehicle starts, and the sequence of GPS points the device produces every few seconds forms a detailed mobility trajectory of the vehicle. Some recent scientific studies compared the mobility patterns emerged from mobile phone data with those emerged from GPS data.

Researchers have been able to extract very detailed information about the people whose data are made available to public. This has sparked a great amount of concern about privacy issues. As an example of liabilities that might happen, New York City released 173 million individual taxi trips. City officials used a very weak cryptography algorithm to anonymize the license number and medallion number, which is an alphanumeric code assigned to each taxi cab. This made it possible for hackers to completely de-anonymize the dataset, and even some were able to extract detailed information about specific passengers and celebrities, including their origin and destination and how much they tipped.

== Characteristics ==
At the large scale, when the behaviour is modelled over a period of relatively long duration (e.g. more than one day), human mobility can be described by three major components:

- trip distance distribution $P(r)$
- radius of gyration $r_g (t)$
- number of visited locations $S(t)$

Brockmann, by analysing banknotes, found that the probability of travel distance follows a scale-free random walk known as Lévy flight of form $P(r)\ \sim r^{-(1+\beta)}$ where $\beta =0.6$. This was later confirmed by two studies that used cell phone data and GPS data to track users. The implication of this model is that, as opposed to other more traditional forms of random walks such as brownian motion, human trips tend to be of mostly short distances with a few long distance ones. In brownian motion, the distribution of trip distances are govern by a bell-shaped curve, which means that the next trip is of a roughly predictable size, the average, where in Lévy flight it might be an order of magnitude larger than the average.

Some people are inherently inclined to travel longer distances than the average, and the same is true for people with lesser urge for movement. Radius of gyration is used to capture just that and it indicates the characteristic distance travelled by a person during a time period t. Each user, within his radius of gyration $r_g (t)$, will choose his trip distance according to $P(r)$.

The third component models the fact that humans tend to visit some locations more often than what would have happened under a random scenario. For example, home or workplace or favorite restaurants are visited much more than many other places in a user's radius of gyration. It has been discovered that $S(t)\ \sim t^{\mu}$ where $\mu = 0.6$, which indicates a sublinear growth in different number of places visited by an individual . These three measures capture the fact that most trips happen between a limited number of places, with less frequent travels to places outside of an individual's radius of gyration.

== Predictability ==
Although the human mobility is modeled as a random process, it is surprisingly predictable. By measuring the entropy of each person's movement, it has been shown that there is a 93% potential predictability. This means that although there is a great variance in type of users and the distances that each of them travel, the overall characteristic of them is highly predictable. Implication of it is that in principle, it is possible to accurately model the processes that are dependent on human mobility patterns, such as disease or mobile virus spreading patterns.

On individual scale, daily human mobility can be explained by only 17 Network motifs. Each individual, shows one of these motifs characteristically, over a period of several months. This opens up the possibility to reproduce daily individual mobility using a tractable analytical model

== Applications ==
Infectious diseases spread across the globe usually because of long-distance travels of carriers of the disease. These long-distance travels are made using air transportation systems and it has been shown that "network topology, traffic structure, and individual mobility patterns are all essential for accurate predictions of disease spreading". On a smaller spatial scale the regularity of human movement patterns and its temporal structure should be taken into account in models of infectious disease spread. Cellphone viruses that are transmitted via bluetooth are greatly dependent on the human interaction and movements. With more people using similar operating systems for their cellphones, it's becoming much easier to have a virus epidemic.

In Transportation Planning, leveraging the characteristics of human movement, such as tendency to travel short distances with few but regular bursts of long-distance trips, novel improvements have been made to Trip distribution models, specifically to Gravity model of migration

== See also ==
- Mobilities
- Private transport
- Network theory
- Personal transporter
- Personal air vehicle
- Personal rapid transit
- Automobile
  - Mass automobility
  - Car dependence
- Bicycle
- Lévy flight
- Scale-free network
- Public transport
- Transportation Geography and Network Science (wikibook)
- Social mobility
