= File binder =

Utility software

File binders are utility software that allow a user to "bind" multiple files together, resulting in a single executable. They are commonly used by hackers to insert other programs such as Trojan horses into otherwise harmless files, making them more difficult to detect. Malware builders (such as keyloggers or stealers) often include a binder by default.

A polymorphic packer is a file binder with a polymorphic engine. It thus has the ability to make its payload mutate over time, so it is more difficult to detect and remove.

== See also ==
- Dendroid (malware)
- MiniPanzer and MegaPanzer – Trojan horses that used file binders for distribution.
- Potentially unwanted program – sometimes have used file binders for distribution.
